= HMS Duncan (1901) =

Pre-dreadnought battleship of the British Royal Navy

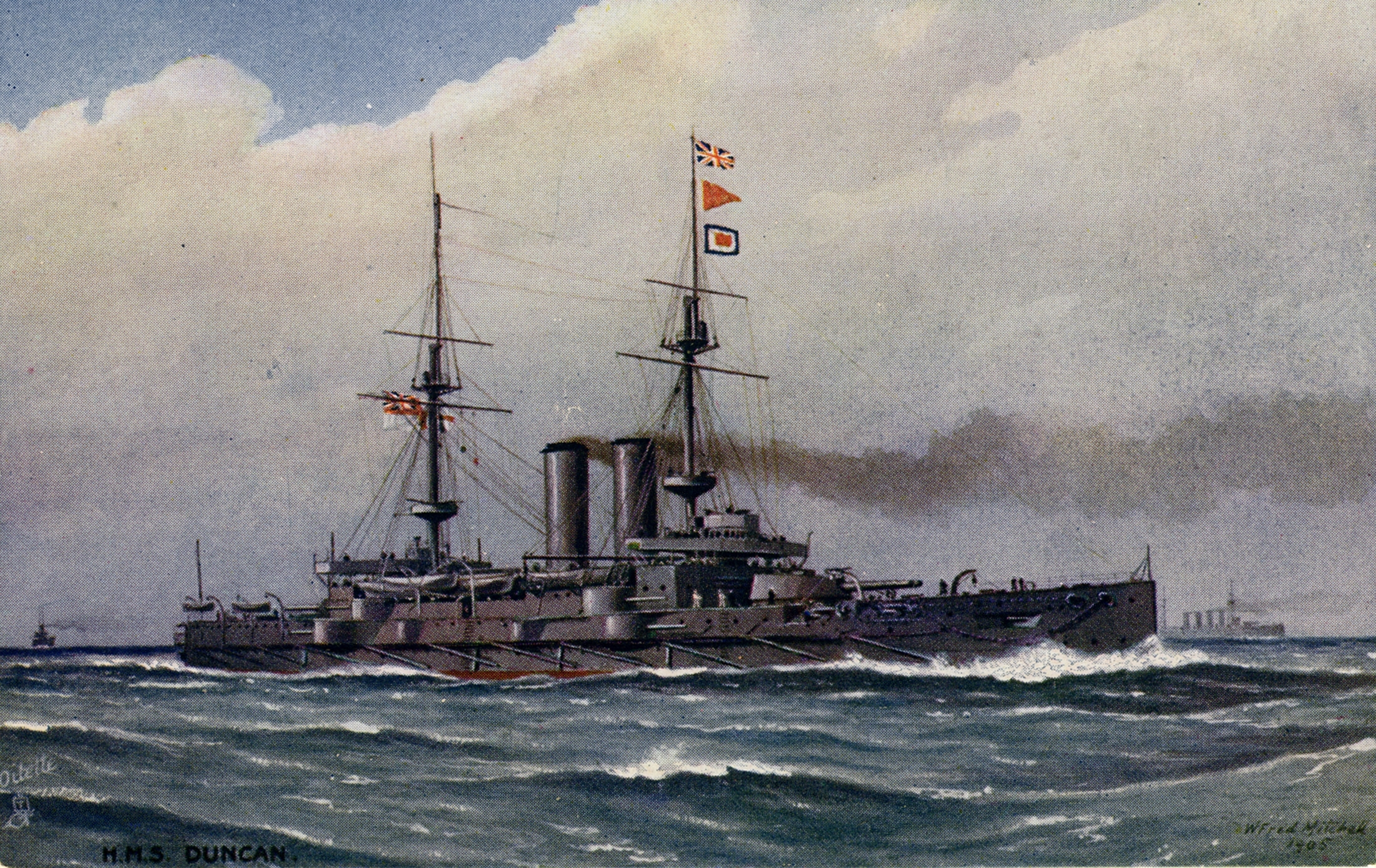
- A 1905 postcard depicting HMS Duncan, painting by William Frederick Mitchell

History

United Kingdom
- Name: HMS Duncan
- Namesake: Adam Duncan, 1st Viscount Duncan
- Builder: Thames Ironworks and Shipbuilding Company, Leamouth
- Laid down: 10 July 1899
- Launched: 21 March 1901
- Completed: October 1903
- Commissioned: 8 October 1903
- Decommissioned: March 1919
- Fate: Sold for scrapping 18 February 1920

General characteristics
- Class & type: Duncan-class pre-dreadnought battleship
- Displacement: Normal: 13,270 to 13,745 long tons (13,483 to 13,966 t); Full load: 14,900 to 15,200 long tons (15,100 to 15,400 t)
- Length: 432 ft (132 m) (loa)
- Beam: 75 ft 6 in (23.01 m)
- Draught: 25 ft 9 in (7.85 m)
- Installed power: 18,000 ihp (13,000 kW); 24 × Belleville water-tube boilers
- Propulsion: 2 × triple-expansion steam engines; 2 × screw propellers
- Speed: 19 knots (35 km/h; 22 mph)
- Range: 6,070 nmi (11,240 km; 6,990 mi) at 10 knots (19 km/h; 12 mph)
- Complement: 720
- Armament: 4 × 12-inch (305 mm) 40-caliber Mk IX guns; 12 × 6-inch (152 mm) 45-calibre guns; 10 × 12-pounder guns; 6 × 3-pounder guns; 4 × 18-inch (457 mm) torpedo tubes (submerged)
- Armour: Belt: 7 in (178 mm); Bulkheads: 11–7 in (279–178 mm); Decks: 2–1 in (51–25 mm); Turrets: 10–8 in (254–203 mm); Barbettes: 11–4 in (279–102 mm); Casemates: 6 in (152 mm); Conning tower: 12 in (305 mm)

HMS Duncan was the lead ship of the six-ship Duncan class of Royal Navy pre-dreadnought battleships. Built to counter a group of fast Russian battleships, Duncan and her sister ships were capable of steaming at 19 knots (35 km/h; 22 mph), making them the fastest battleships in the world. The Duncan-class battleships were armed with a main battery of four 12-inch (305 mm) guns and they were broadly similar to the London-class battleships, though of a slightly reduced displacement and thinner armour layout. As such, they reflected a development of the lighter second-class ships of the Canopus-class battleship. Duncan was built between her keel laying in July 1899 and her completion in October 1903.

Duncan served with the Mediterranean Fleet until 1905, at which she was transferred to the Channel Fleet. During this period, she was damaged in a pair of accidents, the first a collision with HMS Albion in late 1905 and the second when she ran aground off Lundy Island the following year. Duncan served with the Atlantic Fleet from 1907 to late 1908, when she was transferred back to the Mediterranean Fleet. In 1912, she was transferred to the Home Fleet when the Mediterranean Fleet was reorganized into a squadron of it, and the next year she became a gunnery training ship. After the outbreak of the First World War in August 1914, Duncan was being refitted; once she returned to service in September, she joined her sister ships on the Northern Patrol.

In 1915, Duncan was transferred to the 9th Cruiser Squadron based in the central Atlantic. Later that year, she was reassigned to the 2nd Detached Squadron to support the Italian Royal Navy, and in 1916 she was sent to Salonika, Greece. There, she took part in operations against Greek royalists who opposed entering the war on the side of the Allies. Duncan returned to Britain in February 1917 and was converted into a barracks ship before being broken up for scrap in 1920.

== Design ==
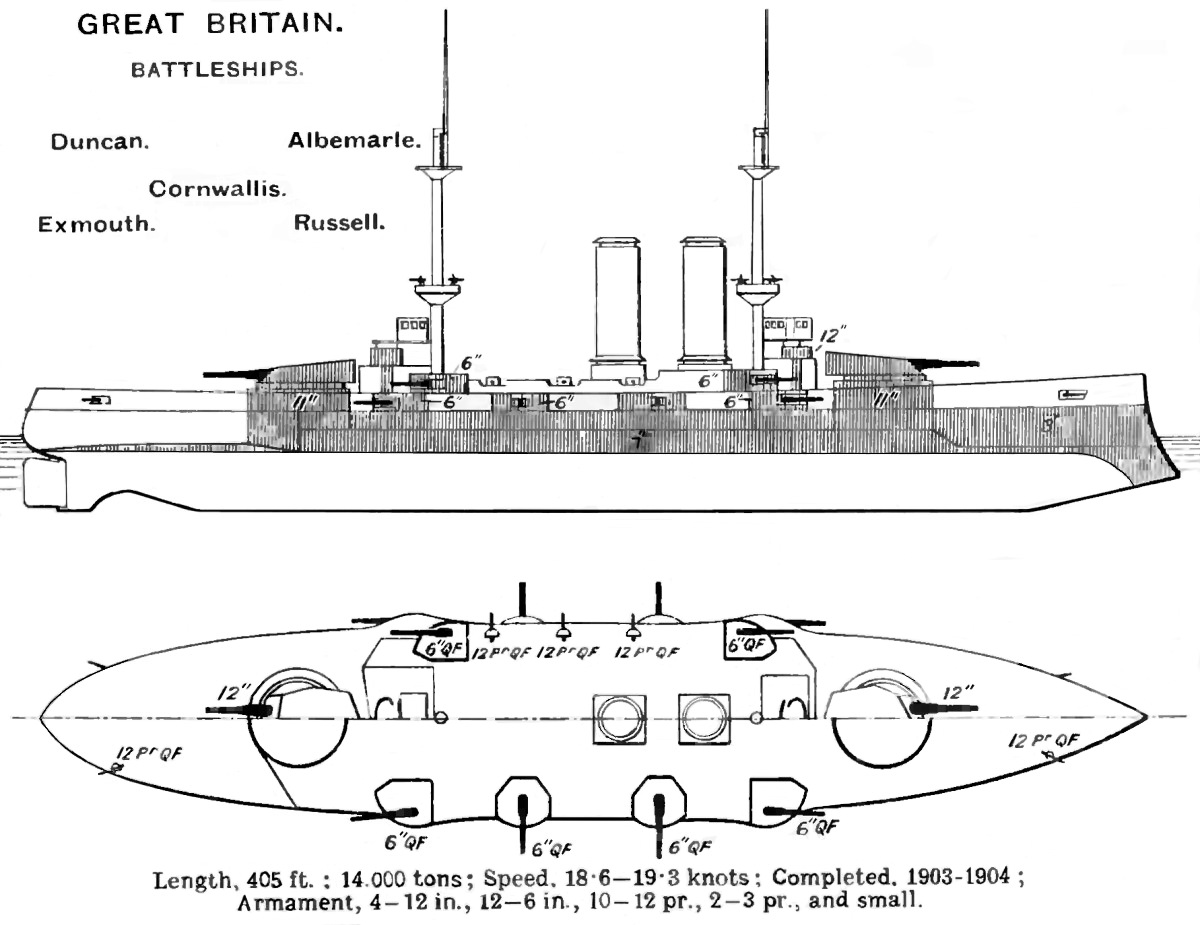
Right elevation and deck plan as depicted in Brassey's Naval Annual 1915

The six ships of the Duncan class were ordered in response to the Russian Peresvet-class battleships that had been launched in 1898. The Russian ships were fast second-class battleships, so William Henry White, the British Director of Naval Construction, designed the Duncan class to match the purported top speed of the Russian vessels. To achieve the higher speed while keeping displacement from growing, White was forced to reduce the ships' armour protection significantly, effectively making the ships enlarged and improved versions of the Canopus-class battleships of 1896, rather than derivatives of the more powerful Majestic, Formidable, and London series of first-class battleships. The Duncans proved to be disappointments in service, owing to their reduced defensive characteristics, though they were still markedly superior to the Peresvets they had been built to counter.

Duncan was 432 feet (132 m) long overall, with a beam of 75 ft 6 in (23.01 m) and a draft of 25 ft 9 in (7.85 m). The Duncan-class battleships displaced 13,270 to 13,745 long tons (13,483 to 13,966 t) normally and up to 14,900 to 15,200 long tons (15,100 to 15,400 t) fully loaded. Her crew numbered 720 officers and ratings. The Duncan-class ships were powered by a pair of 4-cylinder triple-expansion engines that drove two screws, with steam provided by twenty-four Belleville boilers. The boilers were trunked into two funnels located amidships. The Duncan-class ships had a top speed of 19 knots (35 km/h; 22 mph) from 18,000 indicated horsepower (13,000 kW). This made Duncan and her sisters the fastest battleships in the world for several years. At a cruising speed of 10 knots (19 km/h; 12 mph), the ship could steam for 6,070 nautical miles (11,240 km; 6,990 mi).

Duncan had a main battery of four 12-inch (305 mm) 40-calibre guns mounted in twin-gun turrets fore and aft. The ships also mounted a secondary battery of twelve 6-inch (152 mm) 45-calibre guns mounted in casemates, in addition to ten 12-pounder 3 in (76 mm) guns and six 3-pounder 47 mm (1.9 in) guns for defence against torpedo boats. As was customary for battleships of the period, she was also equipped with four 18-inch (457 mm) torpedo tubes submerged in the hull.

Duncan had an armoured belt that was 7 in (178 mm) thick; the transverse bulkhead on the aft end of the belt was 7 to 11 in (178 to 279 mm) thick. Her main battery turrets' sides were 8 to 10 in (203 to 254 mm) thick, atop 11 in (279 mm) barbettes, and the casemate battery was protected with 6 in of Krupp steel. Her conning tower had 12-inch-thick sides. She was fitted with two armoured decks, 1 and 2 in (25 and 51 mm) thick, respectively.

== Operational history ==
=== Pre-First World War ===
HMS Duncan was laid down by Thames Ironworks and Shipbuilding Company, Leamouth, on 10 July 1899, and launched on 21 March 1901. She left the Victoria Dock for Chatham in May 1902, for armament and trials, and was completed in October 1903. HMS Duncan commissioned at Chatham Dockyard on 8 October for Mediterranean Fleet service. She transferred to the Channel Fleet in February 1905. On 26 September that year, she collided with the battleship HMS Albion at Lerwick, suffering hull damage including a hole in her side below the waterline, rudder damage, and the loss of her sternwalk. She suffered another mishap on 23 July 1906, when she grounded off Lundy Island during unsuccessful operations to salvage the battleship HMS Montagu.

Duncan transferred to the Atlantic Fleet in February 1907, and underwent a refit at Gibraltar from November to February 1908. In July, Duncan visited Canada during the Quebec Tercentenary, in company with her sister ships Albemarle, Exmouth, and Russell. On 1 December, Duncan transferred to the Mediterranean Fleet to serve as Second Flagship. She underwent a refit at Malta in 1909. Under a fleet reorganisation on 1 May 1912, the Mediterranean Fleet became the 4th Battle Squadron, Home Fleet, and changed its base from Malta to Gibraltar; Duncan thus became a unit of the squadron at Gibraltar. On 27 May 1913, Duncan recommissioned at Chatham with a nucleus crew and was assigned to the 6th Battle Squadron in the Second Fleet at Portsmouth, where she served as a gunnery training ship in the commissioned reserve. She began a refit at Chatham in May 1914.

=== First World War ===
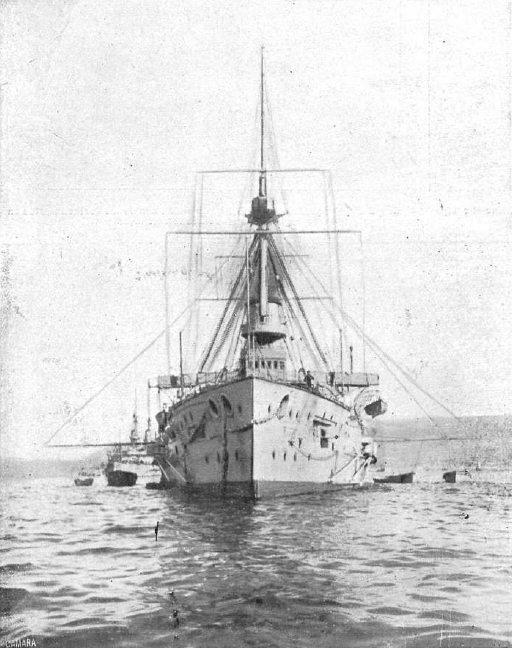
HMS Duncan in 1914

Duncan was still undergoing her refit when the First World War began in August 1914. Plans originally called for Duncan and battleships Agamemnon, Albemarle, Cornwallis, Exmouth, Russell, and Vengeance to form the 6th Battle Squadron in wartime and serve in the Channel Fleet, where the squadron was to patrol the English Channel and cover the movement of the British Expeditionary Force to France. However, plans also existed for the 6th Battle Squadron to be assigned to the Grand Fleet, and, when the war began, the Commander-in-Chief, Grand Fleet, Admiral Sir John Jellicoe, requested that Duncan and her four surviving sister ships (Albemarle, Cornwallis, Exmouth, and Russell) be assigned to the 3rd Battle Squadron in the Grand Fleet for patrol duties to make up for the Grand Fleet's shortage of cruisers. Accordingly, the 6th Battle Squadron was temporarily abolished, and, upon completion of her refit in September 1914, Duncan joined the 3rd Battle Squadron at Scapa Flow, where she joined the Grand Fleet's cruisers on duty in the Northern Patrol.

Duncan and her four sisters, as well as the battleships of the King Edward VII class, were temporarily transferred to the Channel Fleet on 2 November 1914 to reinforce that fleet in the face of Imperial German Navy activity in the Channel Fleet's area. The following day, the German fleet raided Yarmouth; at the time, Duncan and the rest of the 3rd Squadron were dispersed on the Northern Patrol, and were thus unavailable during the German attack. On 13 November 1914, the King Edward VII-class ships returned to the Grand Fleet, but Duncan and her sister ships stayed in the Channel Fleet, where they reconstituted the 6th Battle Squadron on 14 November 1914. This squadron was given a mission of bombarding German submarine bases on the coast of Belgium, and was based at Portland, although it transferred to Dover immediately on 14 November 1914. However, due a lack of antisubmarine defenses at Dover, particularly after the harbour's anti-submarine boom was swept away in a gale, the squadron returned to Portland on 19 November 1914.

The 6th Battle Squadron returned to Dover in December 1914, then transferred to Sheerness on 30 December 1914 to relieve the 5th Battle Squadron there in guarding against a German invasion of the United Kingdom. Between January and May 1915, the 6th Battle Squadron was dispersed. Duncan left the squadron in February 1915 to be reduced to reserve for a refit at Chatham that lasted until July 1915. She recommissioned at Chatham on 19 July 1915 and was attached to the 9th Cruiser Squadron on the Finisterre-Azores-Madeira Station. In August 1915, Duncan transferred to the 2nd Detached Squadron in the Adriatic Sea. The squadron had been organized in May 1915 to reinforce the Italian Navy against the Austro-Hungarian Navy after Italy declared war on Austria-Hungary. Duncan was based at Taranto, Italy, during this service. Admiral Paolo Thaon di Revel, the Italian naval chief of staff, believed that the threat from Austro-Hungarian submarines and naval mines in the narrow waters of the Adriatic was too serious for him to use the fleet for active operations. Instead, Revel decided to implement a blockade at the relatively safer southern end of the Adriatic with the main fleet, while smaller vessels, such as the MAS boats, conducted raids on Austro-Hungarian ships and installations.

In June 1916, Duncan transferred to the 3rd Detached Squadron in the Aegean Sea, based at Salonika. At the time, Greece was ruled by the pro-German Constantine I, who had decided to remain neutral. The Entente powers had landed troops in Salonika in 1915, which was a source of tension between France and Greece. The issue came to a head in August 1916 when a pro-Entente group launched a coup against the monarchy in the Noemvriana. Starting in December 1916, she participated in operations against the Greek royalists, beginning with the landing of Royal Marines at Athens on 1 December 1916 to coerce Constantine to abdicate. The British and French troops were defeated by the Greek Army and armed civilians and were forced to withdraw to their ships, after which the British and French fleet imposed a blockade of the royalist-controlled parts of the country. She returned to the Adriatic Squadron in January 1917. In February, Duncan returned to the United Kingdom and paid off at Sheerness to provide crews for antisubmarine vessels. She was in reserve at Sheerness until April, when she moved to Chatham for a refit. Upon completion of her refit in January 1918, she remained in reserve at Chatham, serving as an accommodation ship. Duncan was placed on the disposal list in March 1919, and was sold for scrapping to Stanlee Shipbreaking Company Limited, in Dover, on 18 February 1920. She was towed to Dover for scrapping in June 1920.
