= HMS Montagu (1901) =

Pre-dreadnought battleship of the British Royal Navy

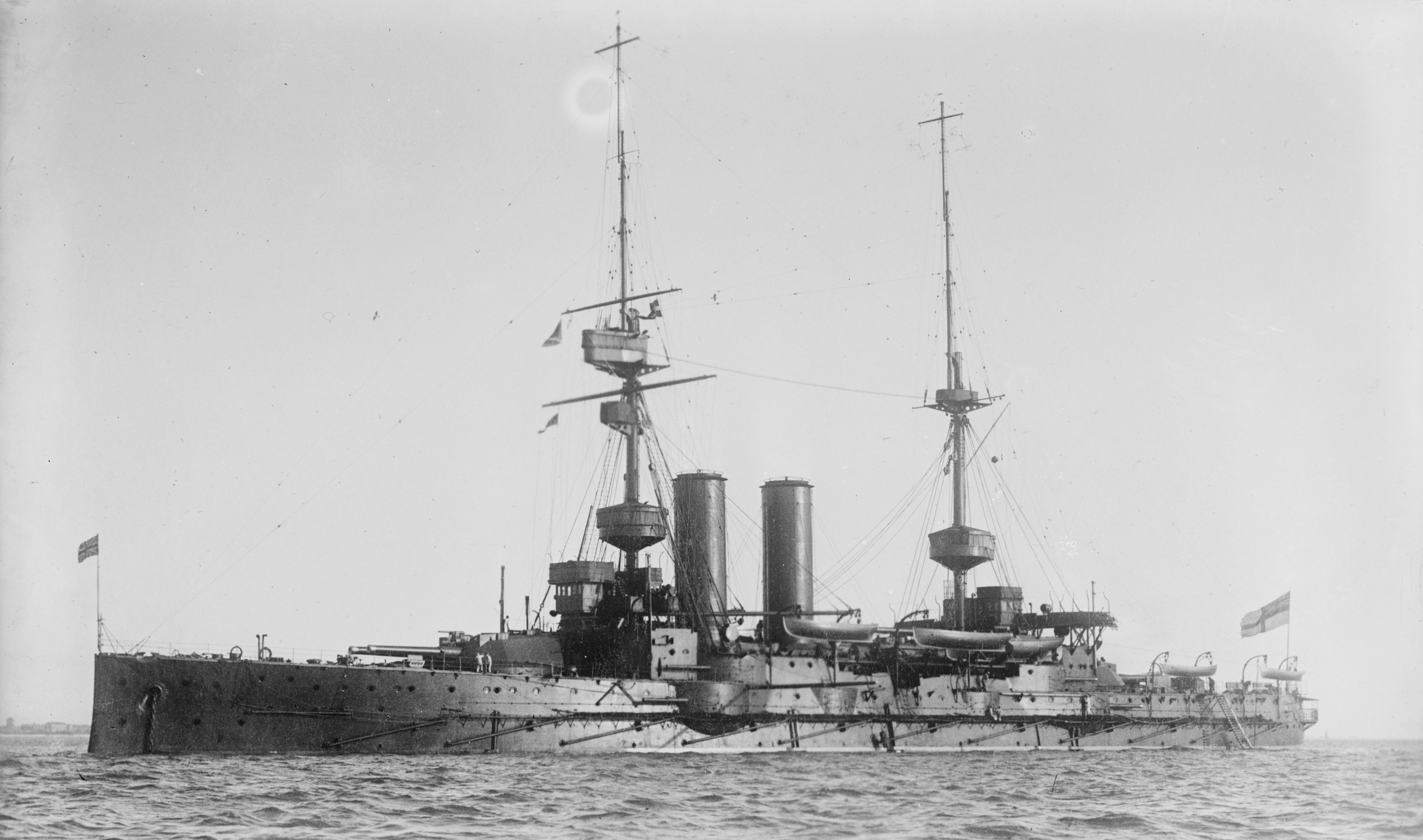
- Montagu's sister ship HMS Albemarle

History

United Kingdom
- Name: HMS Montagu
- Namesake: Ralph Montagu, 3rd Baron Montagu of Boughton, 1st Earl of Montagu
- Builder: Devonport Dockyard
- Laid down: 23 November 1899
- Launched: 5 March 1901
- Commissioned: 28 July 1903
- Fate: Wrecked on Lundy Island, 30 May 1906

General characteristics
- Class & type: Duncan-class pre-dreadnought battleship
- Displacement: Normal: 13,270 to 13,745 long tons (13,483 to 13,966 t); Full load: 14,900 to 15,200 long tons (15,100 to 15,400 t)
- Length: 432 ft (132 m) (loa)
- Beam: 75 ft 6 in (23.01 m)
- Draught: 25 ft 9 in (7.85 m)
- Installed power: 18,000 ihp (13,000 kW); 24 × Belleville water-tube boilers
- Propulsion: 2 × triple-expansion steam engines; 2 × screw propellers
- Speed: 19 knots (35 km/h; 22 mph)
- Range: 6,070 nmi (11,240 km; 6,990 mi) at 10 knots (19 km/h; 12 mph)
- Complement: 720
- Armament: 4 × 12-inch (305 mm) 40-caliber Mk IX guns; 12 × 6-inch (152 mm) 45-calibre guns; 10 × 12-pounder guns; 6 × 3-pounder guns; 4 × 18-inch (457 mm) torpedo tubes (submerged)
- Armour: Belt: 7 in (178 mm); Bulkheads: 11–7 in (279–178 mm); Decks: 2–1 in (51–25 mm); Turrets: 10–8 in (254–203 mm); Barbettes: 11–4 in (279–102 mm); Casemates: 6 in (152 mm); Conning tower: 12 in (305 mm)

HMS Montagu was a Duncan-class pre-dreadnought battleship of the British Royal Navy. Built to counter a group of fast Russian battleships, Montagu and her sister ships were capable of steaming at 19 knots (35 km/h; 22 mph), making them the fastest battleships in the world. The Duncan-class battleships were armed with a main battery of four 12-inch (305 mm) guns and they were broadly similar to the London-class battleships, though of a slightly reduced displacement and thinner armour layout. As such, they reflected a development of the lighter second-class ships of the Canopus-class battleship. Montagu was built between her keel laying in November 1899 and her completion in July 1903. The ship had a brief career, serving for two years in the Mediterranean Fleet before transferring to the Channel Fleet in early 1905. During wireless telegraphy experiments in May 1906, she ran aground off Lundy Island. Repeated attempts to refloat the ship failed, and she proved to be a total loss. She was ultimately broken up in situ.

== Design ==
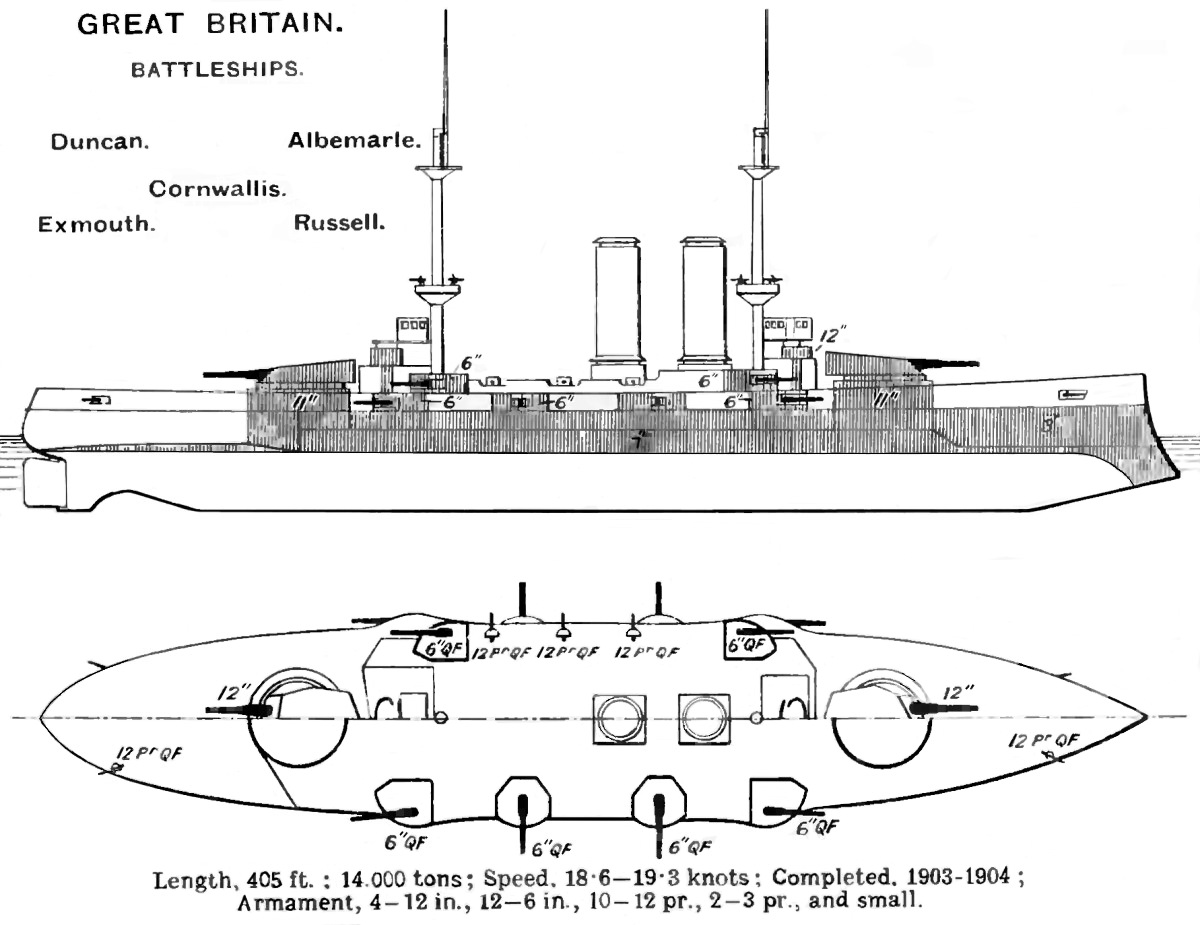
Right elevation and deck plan as depicted in Brassey's Naval Annual 1915

The six ships of the Duncan class were ordered in response to the Russian Peresvet-class battleships that had been launched in 1898. The Russian ships were fast second-class battleships, so William Henry White, the British Director of Naval Construction, designed the Duncan class to match the purported top speed of the Russian vessels. To achieve the higher speed while keeping displacement from growing, White was forced to reduce the ships' armour protection significantly, effectively making the ships enlarged and improved versions of the Canopus-class battleships of 1896, rather than derivatives of the more powerful Majestic, Formidable, and London series of first-class battleships. The Duncans proved to be disappointments in service, owing to their reduced defensive characteristics, though they were still markedly superior to the Peresvets they had been built to counter.

Montagu was 432 feet (132 m) long overall, with a beam of 75 ft 6 in (23.01 m) and a draft of 25 ft 9 in (7.85 m). The Duncan-class battleships displaced 13,270 to 13,745 long tons (13,483 to 13,966 t) normally and up to 14,900 to 15,200 long tons (15,100 to 15,400 t) fully loaded. Her crew numbered 720 officers and ratings. The Duncan-class ships were powered by a pair of 4-cylinder triple-expansion engines that drove two screws, with steam provided by twenty-four Belleville boilers. The boilers were trunked into two funnels located amidships. The Duncan-class ships had a top speed of 19 knots (35 km/h; 22 mph) from 18,000 indicated horsepower (13,000 kW). This made Montagu and her sisters the fastest battleships in the world for several years. At a cruising speed of 10 knots (19 km/h; 12 mph), the ship could steam for 6,070 nautical miles (11,240 km; 6,990 mi).

Montagu had a main battery of four 12-inch (305 mm) 40-calibre guns mounted in twin-gun turrets fore and aft. The ships also mounted a secondary battery of twelve 6-inch (152 mm) 45-calibre guns mounted in casemates, in addition to ten 12-pounder 3 in (76 mm) guns and six 3-pounder 47 mm (1.9 in) guns for defence against torpedo boats. As was customary for battleships of the period, she was also equipped with four 18-inch (457 mm) torpedo tubes submerged in the hull.

Montagu had an armoured belt that was 7 in (178 mm) thick; the transverse bulkhead on the aft end of the belt was 7 to 11 in (178 to 279 mm) thick. The sides of her main battery turrets were 8 to 10 in (203 to 254 mm) thick, atop 11 in (279 mm) barbettes, and the casemate battery was protected with 6 in of Krupp steel. Her conning tower had 12-inch-thick sides. She was fitted with two armoured decks, 1 and 2 in (25 and 51 mm) thick, respectively.

== Service history ==
The keel for HMS Montagu was laid down on 23 November 1899, and her completed hull was launched on 5 March 1901. She began sea trials in February 1903 and was commissioned into the fleet on 28 July at Devonport Dockyard for service in the Mediterranean Fleet. In February 1905, she transferred to the Channel Fleet.

=== Grounding and loss ===
In late May 1906, Montagu tested new wireless telegraphy equipment in the Bristol Channel, sending and receiving test messages with wireless stations ashore. Late on 29 May, she was anchored off Lundy Island, but could not pick up the messages from the test station, so the ship weighed anchor to steam to the Isles of Scilly. Heavy fog forced her to reverse course and steam back to Lundy Island after four hours, but her navigator miscalculated the course, placing her some two miles off her original track. Montagu encountered a pilot cutter cruising in the vicinity of Lundy Island, slowed to a stop, and came alongside the cutter to request a distance and bearing for Hartland Point on the mainland. Though the cutter supplied these accurately, the voice from the battleship's bridge replied that they must be wrong and that the pilot cutter must have lost her bearings. As Montagu restarted her engines and began to move ahead, the cutter shouted back that on her present course Montagu would be on Shutter Rock within ten minutes, and a short time later the sound of the battleship running aground carried through the fog.

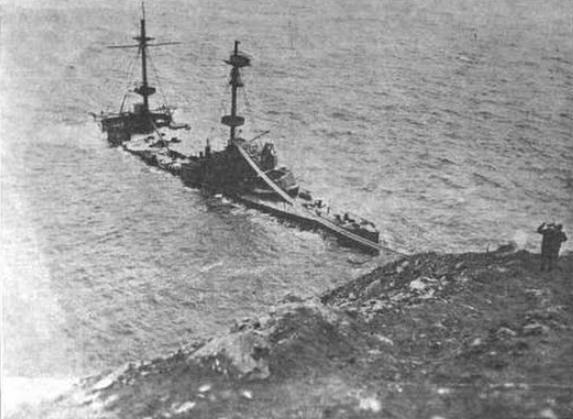
Montagu aground, c. 1907

At 02:00 on 30 May, Montagu ran aground on Shutter Rock, suffering a 91-foot (28 m) gash on her starboard side. Unable to free herself from the rocks, she slowly filled with water; twenty-four hours later, her starboard engine room and all of her boiler rooms were flooded, among others. Her crew counter-flooded the port engine room to prevent her from listing further to starboard. Divers inspected the hull to determine the extent of the damage, which proved to be more serious than initially expected. The bottom of the ship also received extensive damage, including several other holes and the port propeller shaft having been torn from the hull. The starboard bilge keel was also ripped from the hull, as was the rudder. The wreck rested on a fairly even bottom, so there was hope that the ship could be refloated.

Since the Royal Navy had no dedicated salvage unit, it turned to Frederick Young, a former Royal Navy captain who now worked as the chief salvage officer of the Liverpool Salvage Association. Young was at that time the foremost expert on marine salvage in Britain, so he was hired to advise Admiral Sir Arthur Wilson, the commander of the Channel Fleet, who had no experience in salvage operations. The navy initially hoped to lighten the ship by removing the medium and small-caliber guns and other equipment that could be easily taken off and then to pump out the water so that the holes in the hull could be patched. By the end of June, some twenty pumps had been assembled on the scene, with a total pumping capacity of 8,600 tonnes (8,500 long tons; 9,500 short tons) of water per hour. Difficulties with pumping, owing in part to the subdivision of the internal compartments and the need to reflood the ship during high tide to keep her from suffering more damage before the hull could be patched, led the salvors to give up the operation.

Wilson next sought to remove armour plate from the sides of the ship and to erect a series of caissons, at which point a powerful air pump would be used to blow the water out of the hull. The caissons repeatedly broke free even in mild seas, and the air pump failed to have the desired effect. Her sister ship Duncan herself ran aground whilst trying to help the salvage effort, though she was successfully freed. At the end of the summer of 1906, salvage efforts were suspended for the year, with plans to resume them in 1907. However, an inspection of the ship conducted from 1 to 10 October 1906 found that the action of the sea was driving her further ashore and bending and warping her hull so that her seams were beginning to open, her deck planking was coming apart, and her boat davits had collapsed. Having failed to refloat Montagu, the navy decided to abandon the project. Further material was removed from the wreck, including her main battery guns, which were later re-used in other vessels.

The Western Marine Salvage Company of Penzance completed salvage of the wreck for scrap metal over the next 15 years. The court martial convened for the affair blamed the thick fog and faulty navigation for the wreck. The trial was held aboard HMS Victory. The ship's captain, Thomas Adair, and the navigation officer, Lieutenant James Dathan, were severely reprimanded, with both men being dismissed from HMS Montagu; Dathan lost two years of seniority in rank as well. The wreck site, which now amounts to little more than some armour plate on the sea floor, is a popular diving location. Divers have also located parts of her gun turrets and shells that were not recovered during the salvage operation. In September 2019 the British Government granted the wreck site—including the steps which had been chiseled out of the cliff during the salvage effort—protected status.
