= Duncan-class battleship =

Pre-dreadnought battleship class of the British Royal Navy

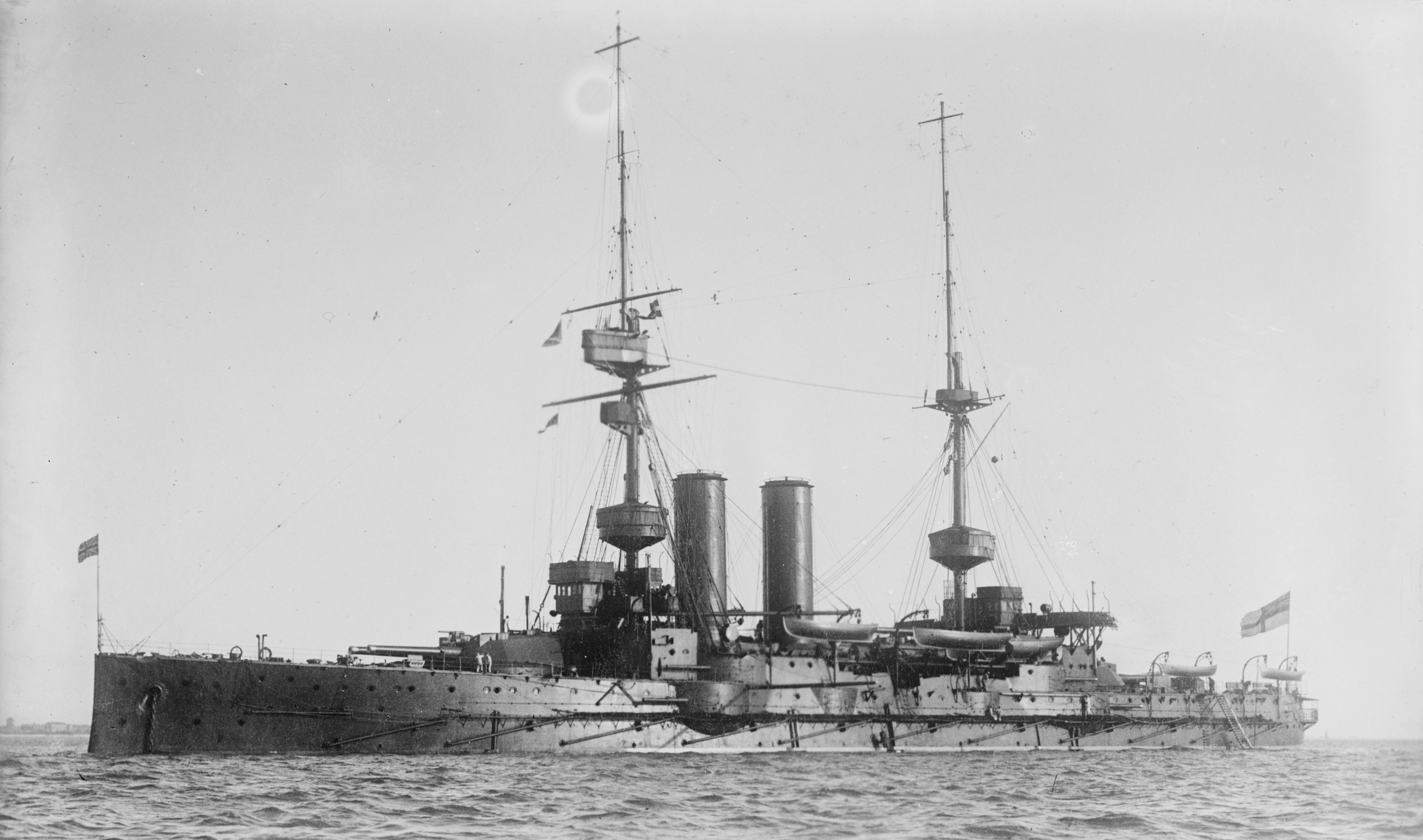
- HMS Albemarle

Class overview
- Name: Duncan class
- Builders: Thames Iron Works (2); Laird Brothers (1); Chatham Dockyard (1); Devonport Dockyard (1); Palmers Shipbuilding & Iron Co. (1)
- Operators: Royal Navy
- Preceded by: London class
- Succeeded by: King Edward VII class
- Built: 1900–1903
- In commission: 1903–1917
- Completed: 6
- Lost: 3
- Retired: 3

General characteristics
- Type: Pre-dreadnought battleship
- Displacement: Normal: 13,270 to 13,745 long tons (13,483 to 13,966 t); Full load: 14,900 to 15,200 long tons (15,100 to 15,400 t)
- Length: 432 ft (132 m)
- Beam: 75 ft 6 in (23.01 m)
- Draught: 25 ft 9 in (7.85 m)
- Installed power: 18,000 ihp (13,000 kW); 24 × Belleville water-tube boilers
- Propulsion: 2 × triple-expansion steam engines; 2 × shafts
- Speed: 19 knots (35 km/h; 22 mph)
- Range: 6,070 nmi (11,240 km; 6,990 mi) at 10 knots (19 km/h; 12 mph)
- Complement: 720
- Armament: 4 × 12-inch (305 mm) 40-caliber Mk IX guns; 12 × 6-inch (152 mm) 45-calibre guns; 10 × 12-pounder guns; 6 × 3-pounder guns; 4 × 18-inch (457 mm) torpedo tubes (submerged)
- Armour: Belt: 7 in (178 mm); Bulkheads: 11–7 in (279–178 mm); Decks: 2–1 in (51–25 mm); Turrets: 10–8 in (254–203 mm); Barbettes: 11–4 in (279–102 mm); Casemates: 6 in (152 mm); Conning tower: 12 in (305 mm)

The Duncan class was a class of six pre-dreadnought battleships built for the Royal Navy in the early 1900s. The six ships—HMS Duncan, HMS Albemarle, HMS Cornwallis, HMS Exmouth, HMS Montagu, and HMS Russell—were ordered in response to Russian naval building, specifically the fast second-class battleships of the Peresvet class, which they were specifically to counter. The foremost design consideration was a high top speed to match the rumoured (and incorrect) top speed of 19 knots (35 km/h; 22 mph) of the Russian ships while maintaining the same battery of 12-inch (300 mm) guns and keeping displacement from growing. This forced significant compromises in armour protection, though the ships adopted a revised system of protection for the bow, which was copied in other designs like the London class.

All members of the class served in the Mediterranean Fleet after completion, thereafter joining the Home, Channel, and Atlantic Fleets over the next ten years. In 1906, Montagu was wrecked off Lundy Island and could not be salvaged. The period passed largely uneventfully for the other members of the class. Following the outbreak of the First World War in August 1914, the ships were sent to reinforce the Grand Fleet, where they were used on the Northern Patrol to help blockade Germany. In November, Russell and Exmouth bombarded Zeebrugge, but otherwise the Duncans saw no action in the first months of the war.

Cornwallis participated in the Dardanelles campaign beginning in early 1915, and most of the other members of the class joined her there over the course of the year. Duncan instead served in the Atlantic and later in the Adriatic Sea and Albemarle remained with the Grand Fleet and later went to Murmansk, Russia, to guard the port. Russell and Cornwallis were sunk by German U-boats in April 1916 and January 1917, respectively. The three surviving members of the class saw little activity in the final two years of the war, though Duncan and Exmouth were involved in the Allied intervention in Greece. All three ships were ultimately sold for scrap in the immediate post-war reduction in naval strength and were broken up in 1920.

== Design ==
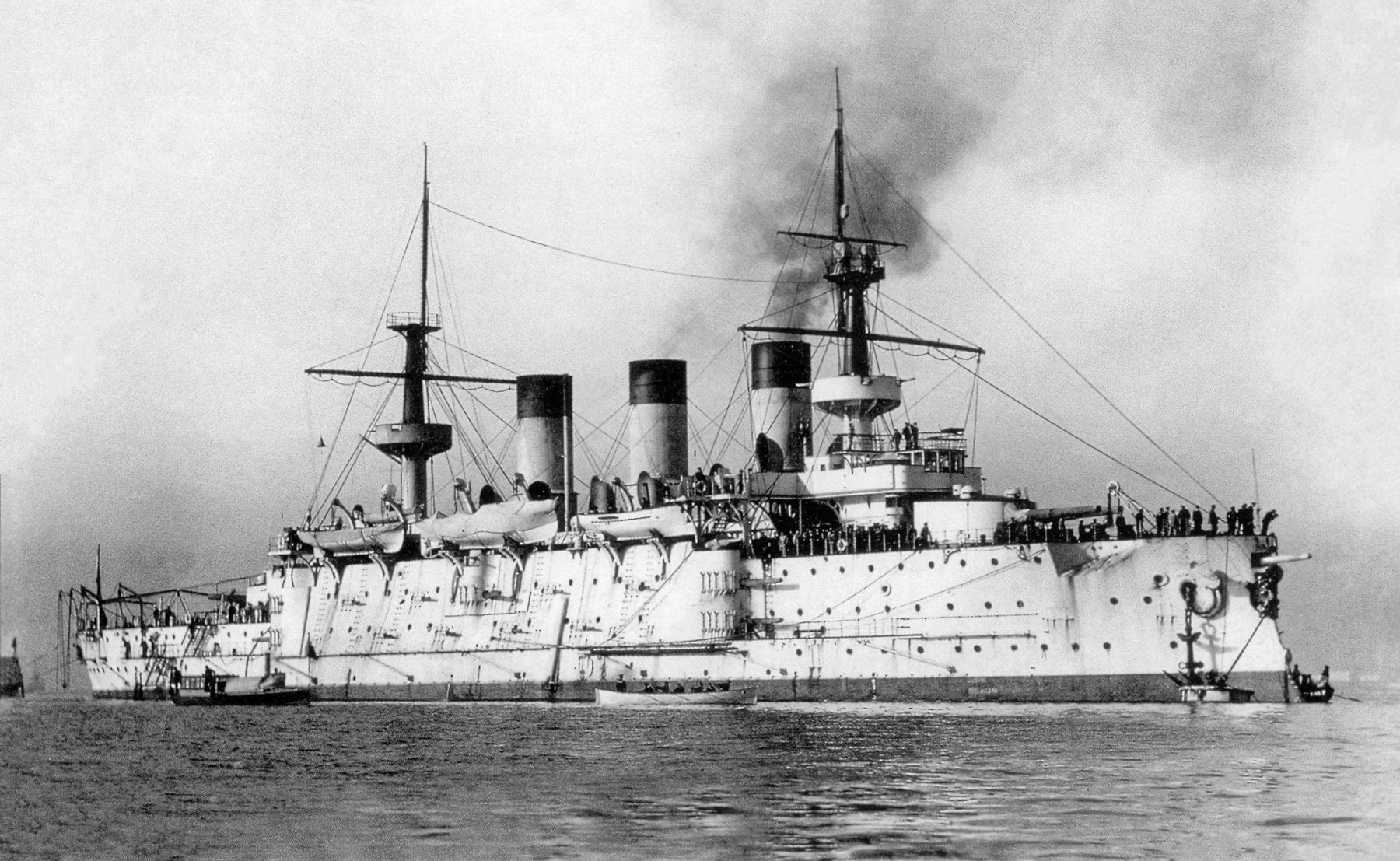
Peresvet, the Russian battleship the Duncans were ordered to counter

The six ships of the Duncan class were ordered in response to Russian Peresvet-class battleships that began construction in the mid-1890s. At the time, the British mistakenly believed the Russian vessels were capable of a top speed of 19 knots (35 km/h; 22 mph) (though they were not that fast in service), so the Director of Naval Construction, William Henry White, set about designing a British response. His initial proposals were completed by February 1898, but the Board of Admiralty decided that more work would be required on the new ships, and so modified versions of the preceding Formidable class would be ordered in the meantime. These ships incorporated some of the aspects of White's design, namely the revised armour protection layout in the bow, which abandoned the heavy transverse bulkhead that connected both ends of the armoured belt in favour of continuing the side armour all the way to the stem, albeit at reduced thickness; these became the five London-class battleships. White then returned to working on the design for the response to Peresvet, completing a revised version on 14 June 1898.

To achieve the desired speed of 19 knots while keeping displacement about 1,000 tonnes (980 long tons) less than the Formidables and retaining the same battery of four 12-inch (305 mm) guns carried by earlier British battleships, White was forced to make significant reductions, particularly in terms of armour protection. As such, they represented an evolution of the smaller Canopus class, rather than a direct development of the Formidable or London types. The Duncan class was about a thousand tons heavier than the Canopus class, and with that increase in displacement, they acquired more powerful guns, heavier armour, and an improvement in top speed by one to two knots. Despite these improvements, the Duncans proved to be disappointments in service, owing to their reduced defensive characteristics, which rendered them inferior to the true first class battleships to which they were inevitably compared. Nevertheless, they were still markedly superior to the Peresvets they had been built to counter, and they were some of the fastest battleships in service at the time they were built.

Minor revisions to the dimensions were made between June and September, when the finalised design was approved, with tenders for shipyard contracts being sent out the following month. Public pressure over the 1898 programme—the first three Londons that were supposedly slower than the Peresvets—led to the passage of a Special Supplementary Programme that allocated funding for the first four Duncans, all of which were laid down in 1899. Two more were added under the 1899 programme.

=== General characteristics and machinery ===
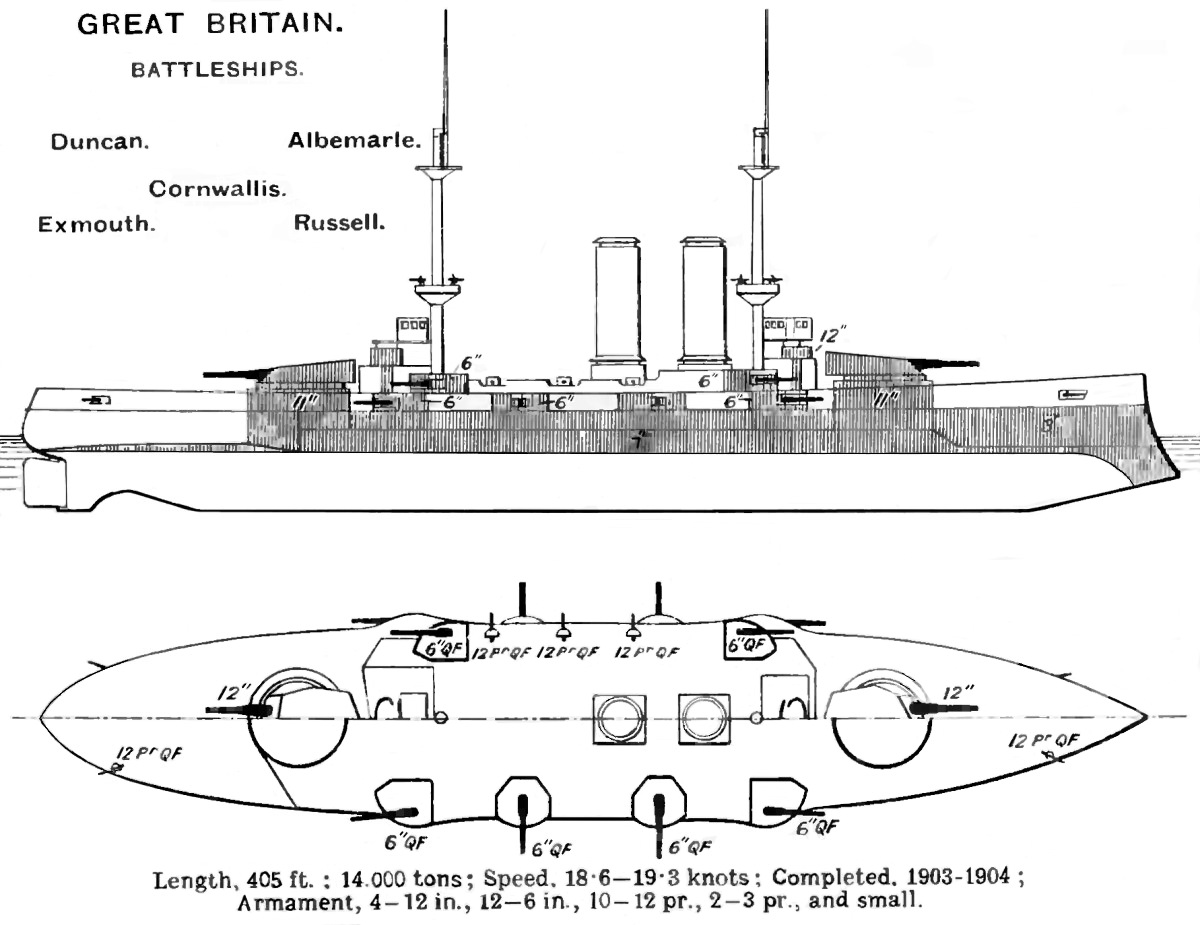
Right elevation and deck plan as depicted in Brassey's Naval Annual 1915

The Duncan-class ships were 432 feet (132 m) long overall, with a beam of 75 ft 6 in (23.01 m) and a draft of 25 ft 9 in (7.85 m). The Duncan-class battleships displaced 13,270 to 13,745 long tons (13,483 to 13,966 t) normally and up to 14,900 to 15,200 long tons (15,100 to 15,400 t) fully loaded. They had two pole masts fitted with fighting tops; each top carried a searchlight, and four additional searchlights were mounted on the forward and aft bridges. The ships' hulls were divided with longitudinal bulkheads that should have allowed for counter-flooding to offset underwater damage, but the equipment necessary to quickly flood a compartment was insufficient, as was typical in many British pre-dreadnought designs. The decision to adopt longitudinal bulkheads was made in large part to keep reserve stability low, since that made the ships more stable gun platforms.

Their crew numbered 720 officers and ratings, though this varied over the course of their careers; in 1904, Russell had a crew of 736, and while serving as a flagship that same year, Exmouth had a crew of 762. During the First World War in 1915, Russell's crew had grown to 781. The ships were fitted with Type 1 wireless telegraphy sets, with the exception of Exmouth, which received Type 2 sets. The remainder of the class had their Type 1s replaced with Type 2 sets later in their career, except for Montagu, which had already been wrecked by that time. Cornwallis and Russell eventually received Type 3 wireless transmitters. The ships carried a number of small boats that varied over the course of their careers, including a variety of steam and sail pinnaces, steam launches, cutters, whalers, gigs, dinghies, and rafts.

The Duncan-class ships were powered by a pair of 4-cylinder triple-expansion engines that drove two inward-turning, four-bladed screws. Steam was provided by twenty-four Belleville boilers. The boilers were divided into four boiler rooms, two of which contained eight boilers each and the other two with four boilers per room; they were trunked into two closely spaced funnels located amidships. The Duncan-class ships had a top speed of 19 knots (35 km/h; 22 mph) from 18,000 indicated horsepower (13,000 kW), though on speed trials their maximum speed ranged from 18.6 to 19.4 knots (34.4 to 35.9 km/h; 21.4 to 22.3 mph), with power slightly exceeding the design figure. At a cruising speed of 10 knots (19 km/h; 12 mph), the ship could steam for 6,070 nautical miles (11,240 km; 6,990 mi).

=== Armament ===
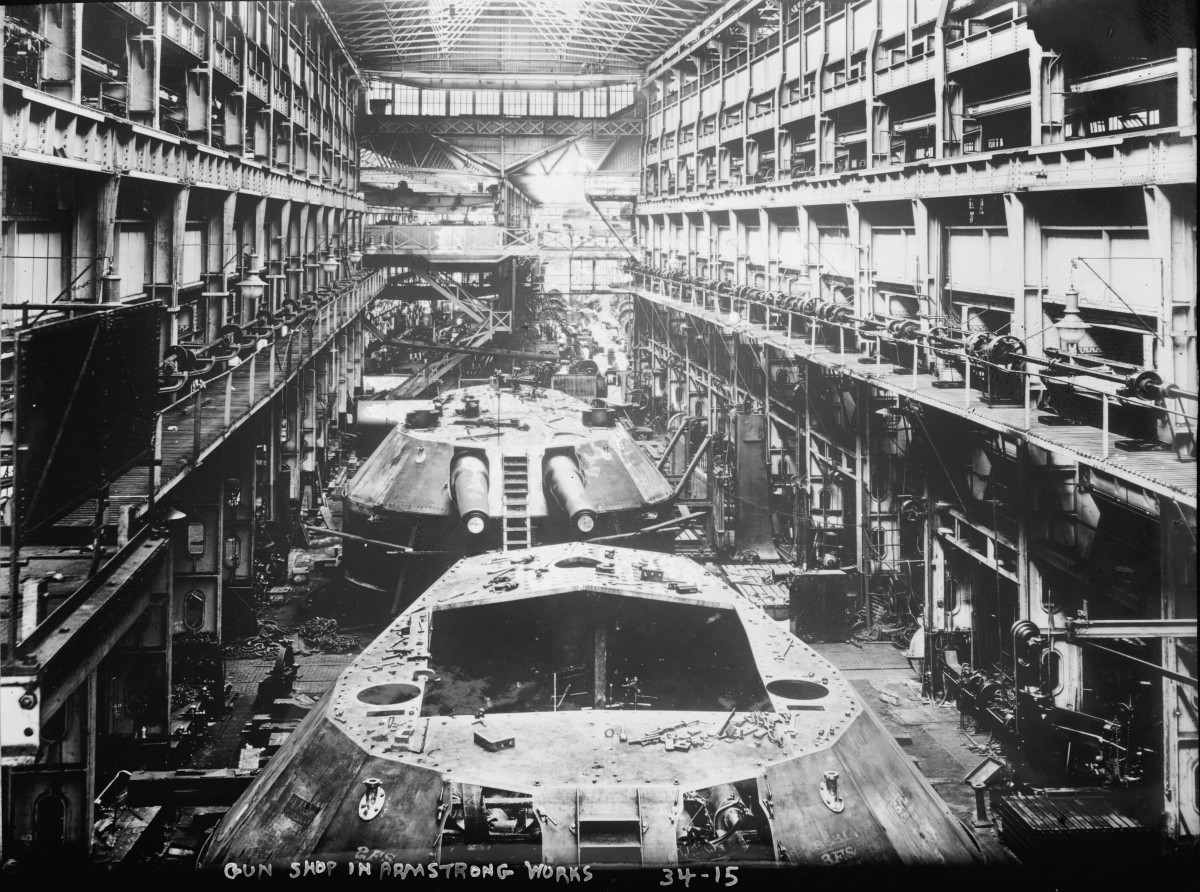
The two turrets for Cornwallis under construction

The Duncans had four 12-inch 40-calibre guns mounted in twin-gun turrets fore and aft. These were the same guns and mountings carried aboard the Formidable and London classes, although their barbettes were reduced in diameter as a weight-saving measure. To account for the slightly narrower barbettes, the gun houses also had to be reduced in size, though the guns were carried in the same BVI-type mountings. The mounts had a range of elevation from -5 degrees to of 13.5 degrees, and required the guns to return to 4.5 degrees to be loaded. The guns had a muzzle velocity of 2,562 to 2,573 feet per second (781 to 784 m/s), and they were capable of penetrating 12 inches of Krupp armour at a range of 4,800 yards (4,400 m). At their maximum elevation, the guns had a range of 15,300 yards (14,000 m).

The ships also mounted a secondary battery of twelve 6-inch (152 mm) 45-calibre guns mounted in casemates, the same battery carried by earlier British battleships. The casemates were sponsoned further out from the sides of the hull, however, to improve their firing arcs while reducing blast effects on the hull when the guns fired ahead or astern. The designers considered moving two of the guns per side to the upper deck to improve their fighting capabilities in heavy seas, but decided that such an arrangement would hamper ammunition movement from the magazines. The guns had a muzzle velocity of 2,536 ft/s (773 m/s). These guns could penetrate six inches of Krupp armour at 2,500 yards (2,300 m). Maximum elevation was 14 degrees, which allowed the guns to engage targets out to 12,000 yards (11,000 m). For defence against torpedo boats, they carried ten 12-pounder guns and six 3-pounder guns. As was customary for battleships of the period, they were also equipped with four 18-inch (457 mm) torpedo tubes submerged in the hull.

In 1915, the five surviving ships received two 3-inch (76 mm) anti-aircraft guns. Albemarle, Duncan, and probably Exmouth had theirs installed on their aft superstructure, while Russell had hers mounted on her quarterdeck and Cornwallis had her guns placed atop their forwardmost casemates. Between 1916 and 1917, Albemarle had her casemate guns removed, with four of the 6-inch guns being relocated to the 12-pounder battery and two of those guns being removed to make room. The 6-inch guns were placed in shielded pivot mounts. In 1917–1918, Albemarle had the rest of her 12-pounders removed altogether.

=== Armour ===
The Duncan class adopted the basic armour layout of the Formidable class, but with significant revision to the forward armour scheme and with significantly thinner levels of protection. Earlier battleship designs had employed a partial armoured belt that terminated abreast of both of the main battery turrets; the ends of the belt were connected by way of transverse bulkheads to create a central citadel that protected the ships' magazines and propulsion machinery spaces. This arrangement left the bow and stern unprotected, and thus highly vulnerable to enemy fire. White was concerned that the unprotected bow could be flooded by even light gunfire, which would reduce speed and maneuverability. Since the Duncans were intended to serve as fast battleships, White decided to reduce the risk of this kind of damage by discarding the forward transverse bulkhead in favor of a complete belt. The main portion of the belt was 7 inches (178 mm) thick and extended to just forward of the fore turret, thereafter being gradually reduced to 5 in (127 mm), then 4 in (102 mm), then to 3 in (76 mm), and finally to 2 in (51 mm) close to the stem. The aft end of the ship retained the traditional transverse bulkhead, which was also 7 in thick. Abaft of the bulkhead, the hull was protected by a strake of 1-inch (25 mm) thick side armour.

Horizontal protection consisted of a pair of armoured decks that covered the ships' vitals. The main deck ran from the stem to the aft bulkhead and was connected to the top of the belt; it was 1 to 2 in thick, with the thicker armour over the central portion of the ship and the thinner steel over the bow. The second deck, at middle deck level, was 1 in thick and covered just the central citadel, sloping down on the sides to the belt. The voids created between the decks and behind the belt were used to store coal, which had the added benefit of increasing the strength of the side protection layout. The bow and stern had a curved armour deck below the waterline that extended from the barbettes to either end of the hull, which was 1 to 2 in thick. The ships' main battery turrets faces and sides were 8 in (203 mm) thick, with 10 in (254 mm) rears and 2–3 in roofs. The turrets sat atop barbettes that were 11 in (279 mm) on the outer face above the belt and 7 in thick behind the belt; their inner faces were reduced to 10 and 4 inches thick, respectively. The casemate battery was protected with 6 in (152 mm) of armour plate, and their ammunition hoists received 2 in of armour protection. The ships' forward conning towers had 10–12 in sides and their aft conning towers had 3 in sides.

== Ships ==
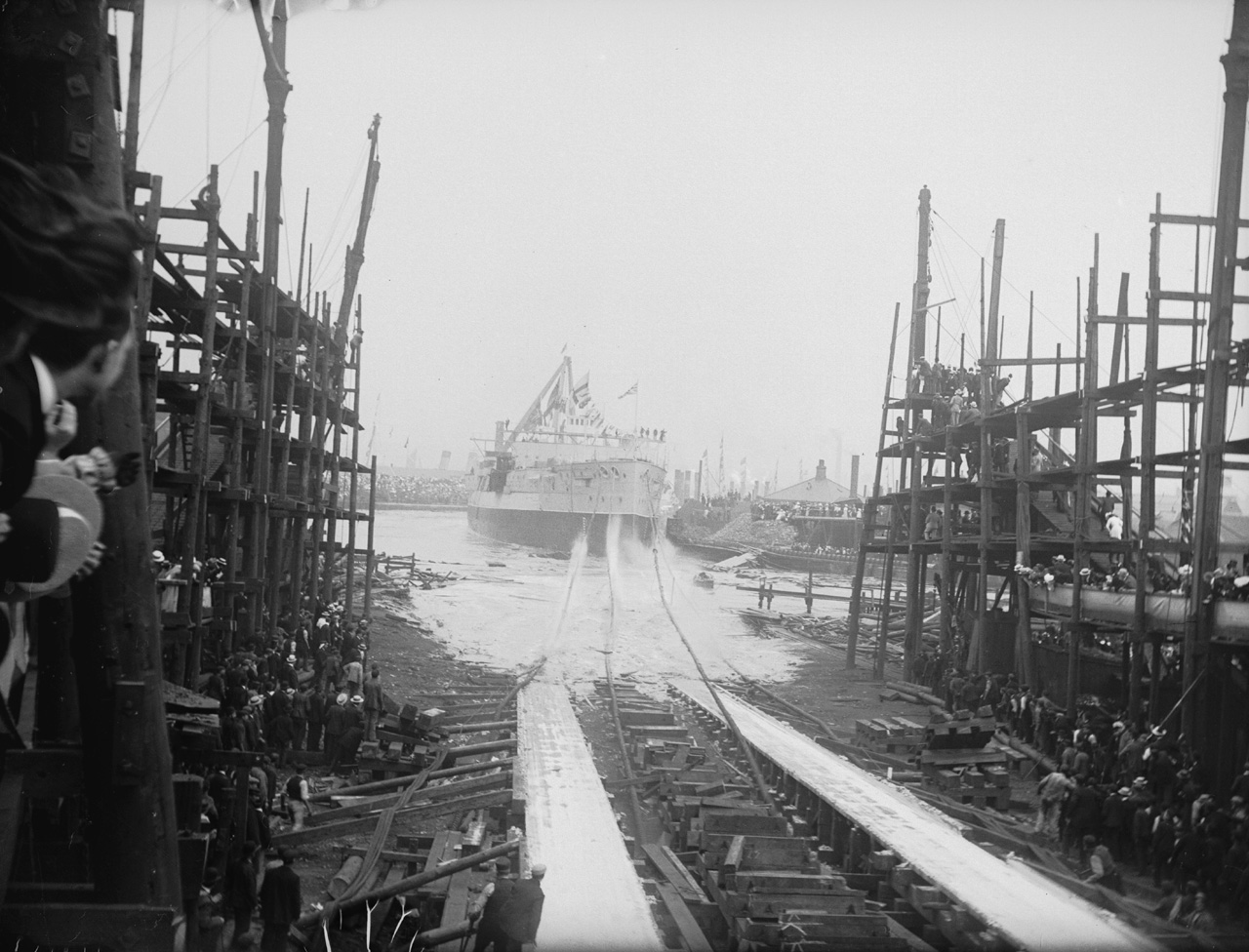
Launch of Cornwallis, 17 July 1901

Construction data
Name	Builder	Laid down	Launched	Completed
Albemarle	Chatham Dockyard	8 January 1900	5 March 1901	November 1903
Cornwallis	Thames Ironworks and Shipbuilding Company	19 July 1899	13 July 1901	February 1904
Duncan	Thames Ironworks and Shipbuilding Company	10 July 1899	21 March 1901	October 1903
Exmouth	Laird Brothers	10 August 1899	31 August 1901	May 1903
Montagu	Devonport Dockyard	23 November 1899	5 March 1901	October 1903
Russell	Palmers Shipbuilding and Iron Company	11 March 1899	19 February 1901	February 1903

== Service history ==
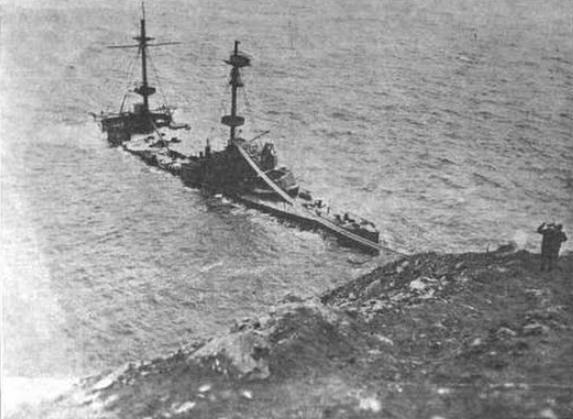
Montagu after having run aground in 1906

From their commissioning in 1903–1904, all six ships served with the Mediterranean Fleet, though their tenure in the unit was relatively short lived, with all of the vessels being reassigned to the Channel Fleet in 1905. Exmouth and Russell had already left the Mediterranean Fleet by that point, doing a brief stint in the Home Fleet in 1904 before joining their sisters in the Channel Fleet. On 30 May 1906, Montagu ran aground on Lundy Island. After lengthy attempts to repair and refloat the ship failed, she was abandoned and broken up in situ. The five surviving ships moved to the Atlantic Fleet in 1907, though Duncan and Exmouth left for another tour with the Mediterranean Fleet in 1908. Cornwallis and Russell joined them there the following year. In July 1908, Russell, Albemarle, Duncan, and Exmouth visited Canada during the Quebec Tercentenary. Albemarle remained in the Atlantic until 1910, when she was reassigned to the Home Fleet. The other four ships joined her there in 1912, and together they formed first the 4th Battle Squadron and later the 6th Battle Squadron. They remained in the 6th Squadron until the outbreak of the First World War in August 1914.

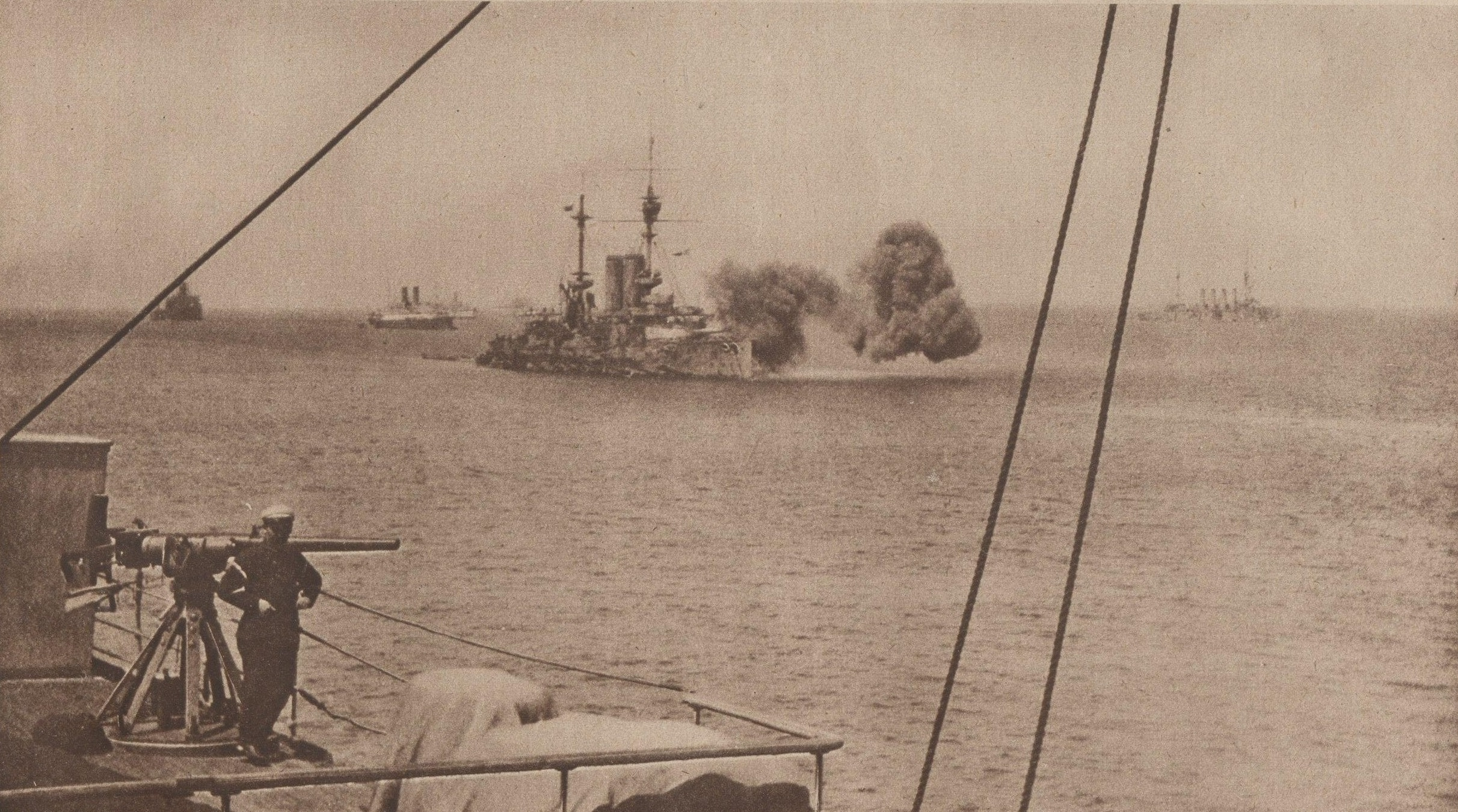
Cornwallis firing during operations off the Dardanelles

With the onset of hostilities, Admiral John Jellicoe, the commander of the Grand Fleet, requested that the 6th Squadron ships be sent to strengthen the main British fleet in accordance with pre-war plans. The five Duncans were used to reinforce the cruisers on the Northern Patrol, maintaining the distant blockade of Germany. While serving with the Grand Fleet, the ships were assigned to the 3rd Battle Squadron On 2 November, they were transferred to the Channel Fleet owing to increased German naval activity in the southern North Sea; there, they reconstituted the 6th Squadron on 14 November. Russell and Exmouth bombarded German-occupied Zeebrugge, which was being used as an advance naval base for U-boats, in late November, though they inflicted little damage and the Germans quickly resumed operations there. The ships were used to guard the southern British coast against German attacks through the end of the year, and in the first half of 1915, the 6th Squadron was gradually dispersed.

Cornwallis was the first to leave, in January 1915, when she was sent to join the Dardanelles campaign against the Ottoman Empire. She participated in numerous attacks on the coastal fortresses guarding the Dardanelles, all of which failed to break through, leading to the Gallipoli Campaign, which Cornwallis also supported. Albemarle was recalled to the Grand Fleet for further duty on the Northern Patrol in April. In May, Exmouth was also sent to reinforce the Dardanelles squadron. Fitted with heavy anti-torpedo nets, she was the only battleship stationed forward at Kephalo just outside the straits, owing to the increased threat of German U-boats in the area. Duncan was reassigned to the Finisterre-Azores-Madeira Station in July 1915, thereafter joining the Italian fleet in the Adriatic, where she saw little activity. Russell was transferred to the Dardanelles campaign in November 1915; Albemarle was to have gone at the same time, but she was badly damaged in a storm and was unable to make the voyage. Russell saw little activity there, apart from supporting the evacuation of Cape Helles in January 1916.

Albemarle remained with the Grand Fleet through January 1916, when she was assigned as a guard ship for the Russian port of Murmansk. While cruising off Malta on 27 April 1916, Russell struck a pair of naval mines that had been laid by the U-boat U-73. She quickly caught fire, exploded, and then capsized and sank with the loss of 125 of her crew. Cornwallis met a similar fate on 9 January 1917, when she was torpedoed and sunk by U-32, though she remained afloat long enough for most of her crew to be evacuated by escorting destroyers; only fifteen men were killed in the sinking. Exmouth and Duncan were stationed in Salonika, Greece, during the Allied intervention in the Noemvriana coup in 1916. Both ships sent men ashore as part of the intervention. Albemarle returned to Britain in September 1916 and was laid up for the rest of her existence. She, Exmouth, and Duncan survived the war and all three were eventually broken up for scrap in 1920.
