= HMS Albemarle (1901) =

Pre-dreadnought battleship of the British Royal Navy

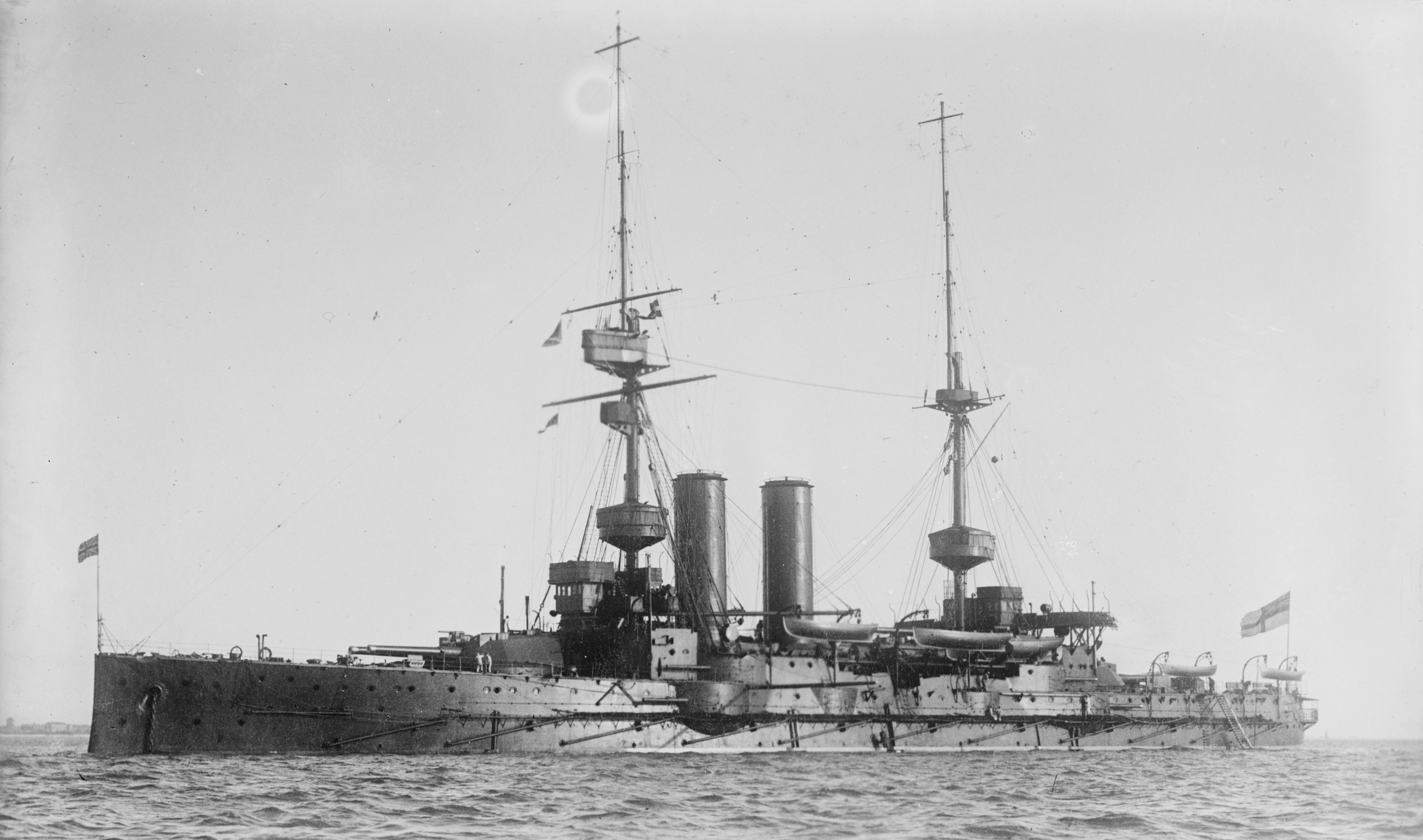
- HMS Albemarle

History

United Kingdom
- Name: HMS Albemarle
- Namesake: George Monck, 1st Duke of Albemarle.
- Builder: Chatham Dockyard
- Laid down: 1 January 1900
- Launched: 5 March 1901
- Completed: November 1903
- Commissioned: 12 November 1903
- Decommissioned: April 1919
- Fate: Broken up, 1920

General characteristics
- Class & type: Duncan-class pre-dreadnought battleship
- Displacement: Normal: 13,270 to 13,745 long tons (13,483 to 13,966 t); Full load: 14,900 to 15,200 long tons (15,100 to 15,400 t)
- Length: 432 ft (132 m) (loa)
- Beam: 75 ft 6 in (23.01 m)
- Draught: 25 ft 9 in (7.85 m)
- Installed power: 18,000 ihp (13,000 kW); 24 × Belleville water-tube boilers
- Propulsion: 2 × triple-expansion steam engines; 2 × screw propellers
- Speed: 19 knots (35 km/h; 22 mph)
- Range: 6,070 nmi (11,240 km; 6,990 mi) at 10 knots (19 km/h; 12 mph)
- Complement: 720
- Armament: 4 × 12-inch (305 mm) 40-caliber Mk IX guns; 12 × 6-inch (152 mm) 45-calibre guns; 10 × 12-pounder guns; 6 × 3-pounder guns; 4 × 18-inch (457 mm) torpedo tubes (submerged)
- Armour: Belt: 7 in (178 mm); Bulkheads: 11–7 in (279–178 mm); Decks: 2–1 in (51–25 mm); Turrets: 10–8 in (254–203 mm); Barbettes: 11–4 in (279–102 mm); Casemates: 6 in (152 mm); Conning tower: 12 in (305 mm)

HMS Albemarle was a pre-dreadnought Duncan-class battleship of the Royal Navy, named after George Monck, 1st Duke of Albemarle. Built to counter a group of fast Russian battleships, Albemarle and her sister ships were capable of steaming at 19 knots (35 km/h; 22 mph), making them the fastest battleships in the world. The Duncan-class battleships were armed with a main battery of four 12-inch (305 mm) guns and they were broadly similar to the London-class battleships, though of a slightly reduced displacement and thinner armour layout. As such, they reflected a development of the lighter second-class ships of the Canopus-class battleship. Albemarle was built between her keel laying in January 1900 and her completion in November 1903.

Albemarle had a fairly uneventful career. She spent her first years in service with the Mediterranean Fleet from 1903 to 1905, when she was transferred to the Channel Fleet. In 1907, she was reassigned to the Atlantic Fleet; in early 1910 she transferred to the Home Fleet, first as part of the 4th Battle Squadron and later the 6th Battle Squadron. She served with the Grand Fleet on the Northern Patrol during the early stages of the First World War. She was later dispatched to Murmansk in Russia for guard and icebreaking duties for most of 1916. On her return to England, she underwent a refit and was in reserve for the remainder of the war. Decommissioned in April 1919, she was scrapped in 1920.

== Design ==
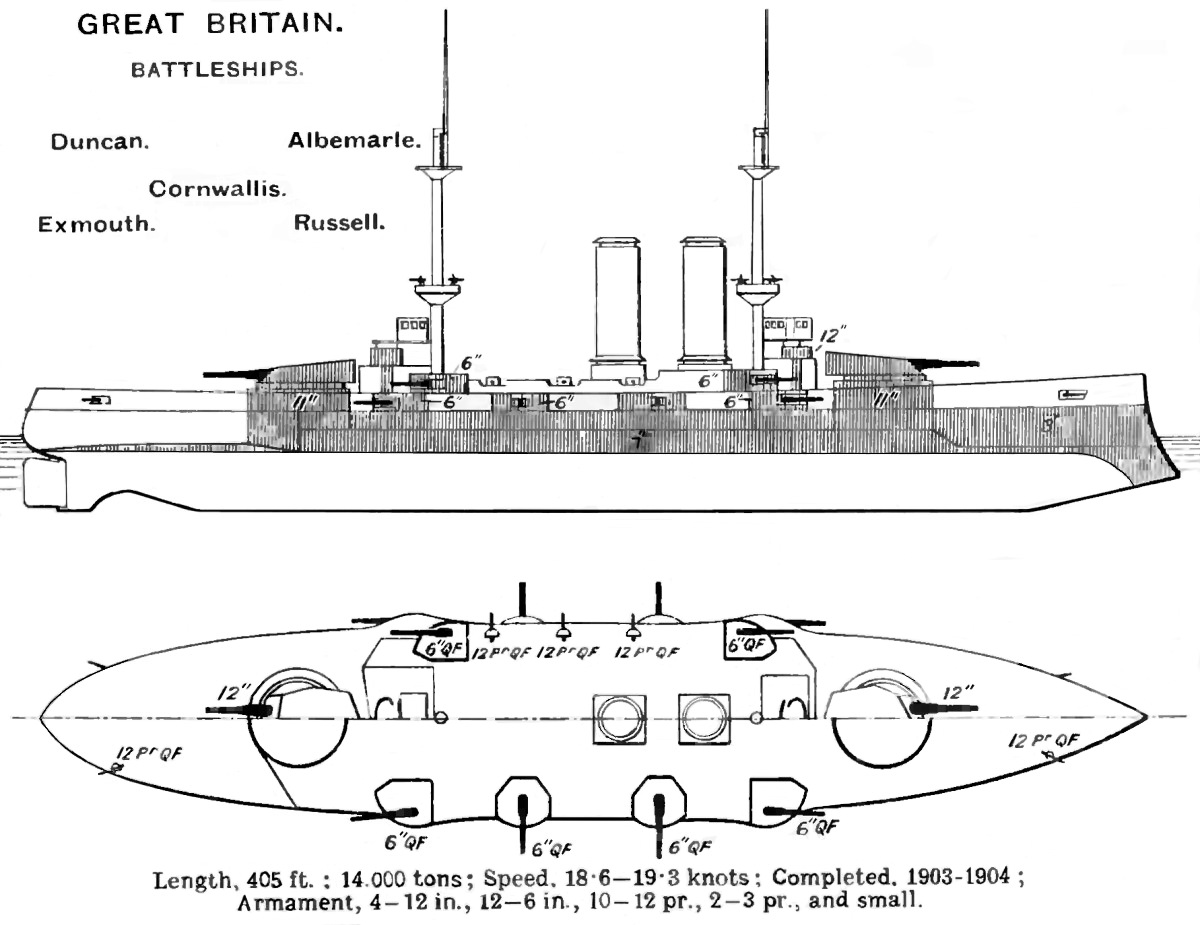
Right elevation and deck plan as depicted in Brassey's Naval Annual 1915

The six ships of the Duncan class were ordered in response to the Russian Peresvet-class battleships that had been launched in 1898. The Russian ships were fast second-class battleships, so William Henry White, the British Director of Naval Construction, designed the Duncan class to match the purported top speed of the Russian vessels. To achieve the higher speed while keeping displacement from growing, White was forced to reduce the ships' armour protection significantly, effectively making the ships enlarged and improved versions of the Canopus-class battleships of 1896, rather than derivatives of the more powerful Majestic, Formidable, and London series of first-class battleships. The Duncans proved to be disappointments in service, owing to their reduced defensive characteristics, though they were still markedly superior to the Peresvets they had been built to counter.

Albemarle was 432 feet (132 m) long overall, with a beam of 75 ft 6 in (23.01 m) and a draft of 25 ft 9 in (7.85 m). The Duncan-class battleships displaced 13,270 to 13,745 long tons (13,483 to 13,966 t) normally and up to 14,900 to 15,200 long tons (15,100 to 15,400 t) fully loaded. Her crew numbered 720 officers and ratings. The Duncan-class ships were powered by a pair of 4-cylinder triple-expansion engines that drove two screws, with steam provided by 24 Belleville boilers. The boilers were trunked into two funnels located amidships. The Duncan-class ships had a top speed of 19 knots (35 km/h; 22 mph) from 18,000 indicated horsepower (13,000 kW). This made Albemarle and her sisters the fastest battleships in the world for several years. At a cruising speed of 10 knots (19 km/h; 12 mph), the ship could steam for 6,070 nautical miles (11,240 km; 6,990 mi).

Albemarle had a main battery of four 12-inch (305 mm) 40-calibre guns mounted in twin-gun turrets fore and aft. The ships also mounted a secondary battery of twelve 6-inch (152 mm) 45-calibre guns mounted in casemates, in addition to ten 12-pounder 3 in (76 mm) guns and six 3-pounder 47 mm (1.9 in) guns for defence against torpedo boats. As was customary for battleships of the period, she was also equipped with four 18-inch (457 mm) torpedo tubes submerged in the hull.

Albemarle had an armoured belt that was 7 in (178 mm) thick; the transverse bulkhead on the aft end of the belt was 7 to 11 in (178 to 279 mm) thick. Her main battery turrets' sides were 8 to 10 in (203 to 254 mm) thick, atop 11 in (279 mm) barbettes, and the casemate battery was protected with 6 in of Krupp steel. Her conning tower had 12-inch-thick sides. She was fitted with two armoured decks, 1 and 2 in (25 and 51 mm) thick, respectively.

== Operational history ==
=== Pre-First World War ===
HMS Albemarle, named for George Monck, 1st Duke of Albemarle, was laid down on 1 January 1900 at Chatham Dockyard, and launched on 5 March 1901, when Lady Kennedy, wife of Admiral Sir William Kennedy, Commander-in-Chief of the Nore, performed the christening. She was completed in November 1903. Albemarle was commissioned at Chatham Dockyard on 12 November 1903 for service as Flag extra, Rear Admiral, for the second division of the Mediterranean Fleet. In February 1905 she was transferred to the Channel Fleet to serve as 2nd Flagship for the fleet's deputy commander. She was transferred to the Atlantic Fleet on 31 January 1907, serving as 2nd Flagship there as well. Under Captain Robert Falcon Scott's command, she collided with the battleship HMS Commonwealth on 11 February 1907, suffering minor bow damage.

In July 1908, Albemarle visited Canada during the Quebec Tercentenary, in company with her sister ships Exmouth, Duncan, and Russell. She became Flagship, Rear Admiral, at Gibraltar in January 1909 and went to Malta for a refit from May through August 1909. Her Atlantic Fleet service ended in February 1910. On 25 February 1910, Albemarle was recommissioned for service in the 3rd Division, Home Fleet, at Portsmouth. She was paid off at Portsmouth Dockyard for a refit on 30 October 1911; the refit lasted from January to December 1912. Her refit complete, Albemarle was recommissioned at Portsmouth to serve in the 4th Battle Squadron in the First Fleet there. On 15 May 1913, she was reduced to a nucleus crew and assigned to the 6th Battle Squadron, Second Fleet, to serve as a gunnery training ship.

=== First World War ===
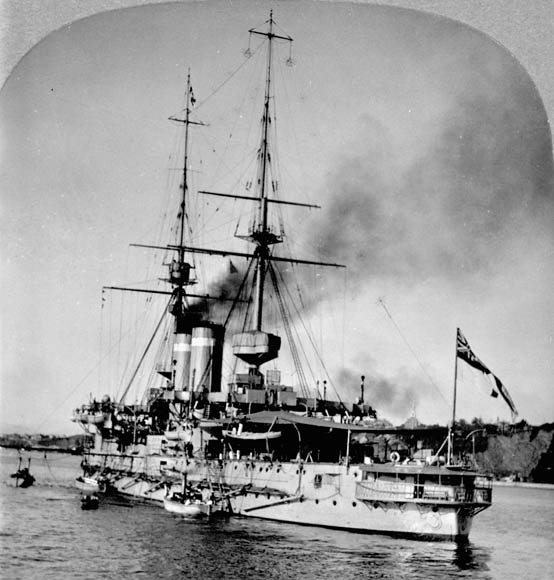
Albemarle in Canada in 1908

When the First World War began in August 1914, plans originally called for Albemarle and battleships Agamemnon, Cornwallis, Duncan, Exmouth, Russell, and Vengeance to form the 6th Battle Squadron and serve in the Channel Fleet, where it was to patrol the English Channel and cover the movement of the British Expeditionary Force to France. However, plans also existed for the 6th Battle Squadron to be assigned to the Grand Fleet, and, when the war began, the Commander-in-Chief, Grand Fleet, Admiral Sir John Jellicoe, requested that Albemarle and her four surviving sister ships of the Duncan class (Cornwallis, Duncan, Exmouth, and Russell) be assigned to the 3rd Battle Squadron in the Grand Fleet for patrol duties to make up for the Grand Fleet's shortage of cruisers. Accordingly, the 6th Battle Squadron was abolished temporarily, and Albemarle joined the 3rd Battle Squadron at Scapa Flow on 8 August 1914, and worked with Grand Fleet cruisers on the Northern Patrol.

Albemarle and her four Duncan-class sisters, as well as the battleships of the King Edward VII class, temporarily were transferred to the Channel Fleet on 2 November 1914 to reinforce that fleet in the face of Imperial German Navy activity in the Channel Fleet's area. The following day, the German fleet raided Yarmouth; at the time, Albemarle and the rest of the 3rd Squadron were dispersed on the Northern Patrol, and were thus unavailable during the German attack. On 13 November 1914, the King Edward VII-class ships returned to the Grand Fleet, but Albemarle and the other Duncans stayed in the Channel Fleet, where they reconstituted the 6th Battle Squadron on 14 November 1914. This squadron was given a mission of bombarding German submarine bases on the coast of Belgium, and was based at Portland, although it transferred to Dover immediately on 14 November 1914. However, due to a lack of anti-submarine defenses at Dover, particularly after the harbour's anti-submarine boom was swept away in a gale, the squadron returned to Portland on 19 November 1914. The squadron was intended to guard against an attempt by the German fleet to land an invasion force in Britain.

The 6th Battle Squadron returned to Dover in December 1914, then transferred to Sheerness on 30 December 1914 to relieve the 5th Battle Squadron there in guarding against a German invasion of the United Kingdom. Between January and May 1915, the 6th Battle Squadron was dispersed. Albemarle left the squadron in April 1915 and rejoined the 3rd Battle Squadron in the Grand Fleet. She underwent a refit at Chatham Dockyard in October 1915. In November 1915, Albemarle was ordered to move to the Mediterranean with a division of the 3rd Battle Squadron that also included the battleships Hibernia (the flagship), Zealandia, and Russell. The ships left Scapa Flow on 6 November 1915, but encountered extremely heavy weather that night in the Pentland Firth. Albemarle, heavily loaded with spare ammunition, suffered severe damage early on 7 November in the rough seas, having her forward bridge washed away, killing all of her bridge personnel. Her forward superstructure was also badly damaged in the incident.

When her repairs were complete in December 1915, Albemarle was ordered to rejoin the Grand Fleet. She thus became the only Duncan-class ship (other than Montagu, which had been wrecked before the war) with no wartime Mediterranean service. In January 1916, Albemarle was detached from the Grand Fleet to serve in North Russia at Murmansk as a guard ship and as an icebreaker in the approaches to Arkhangelsk. At Murmansk, she also served as flagship of Senior Naval Officer, Murmansk. Albemarle returned to the United Kingdom in September 1916, paying off at Portsmouth to provide crews for anti-submarine vessels. She began a refit at Liverpool in October 1916, and upon its completion in March 1917 she went into reserve at Devonport Dockyard; her main-deck casemate 6-inch guns were removed and replaced with four 6-inch guns on her battery deck between September 1916 and May 1917. Albemarle was in reserve until April 1919, used as an overflow accommodation ship for the naval barracks at Devonport, and was attached to the Gunnery School in 1919. The ship was placed on the disposal list in April 1919 and on the sale list in August 1919. She was sold for scrapping to Cohen Shipbeaking Company on 19 November 1919 and arrived at Swansea for scrapping in April 1920.
