= Peresvet-class battleship =

Pre-dreadnought battleship class

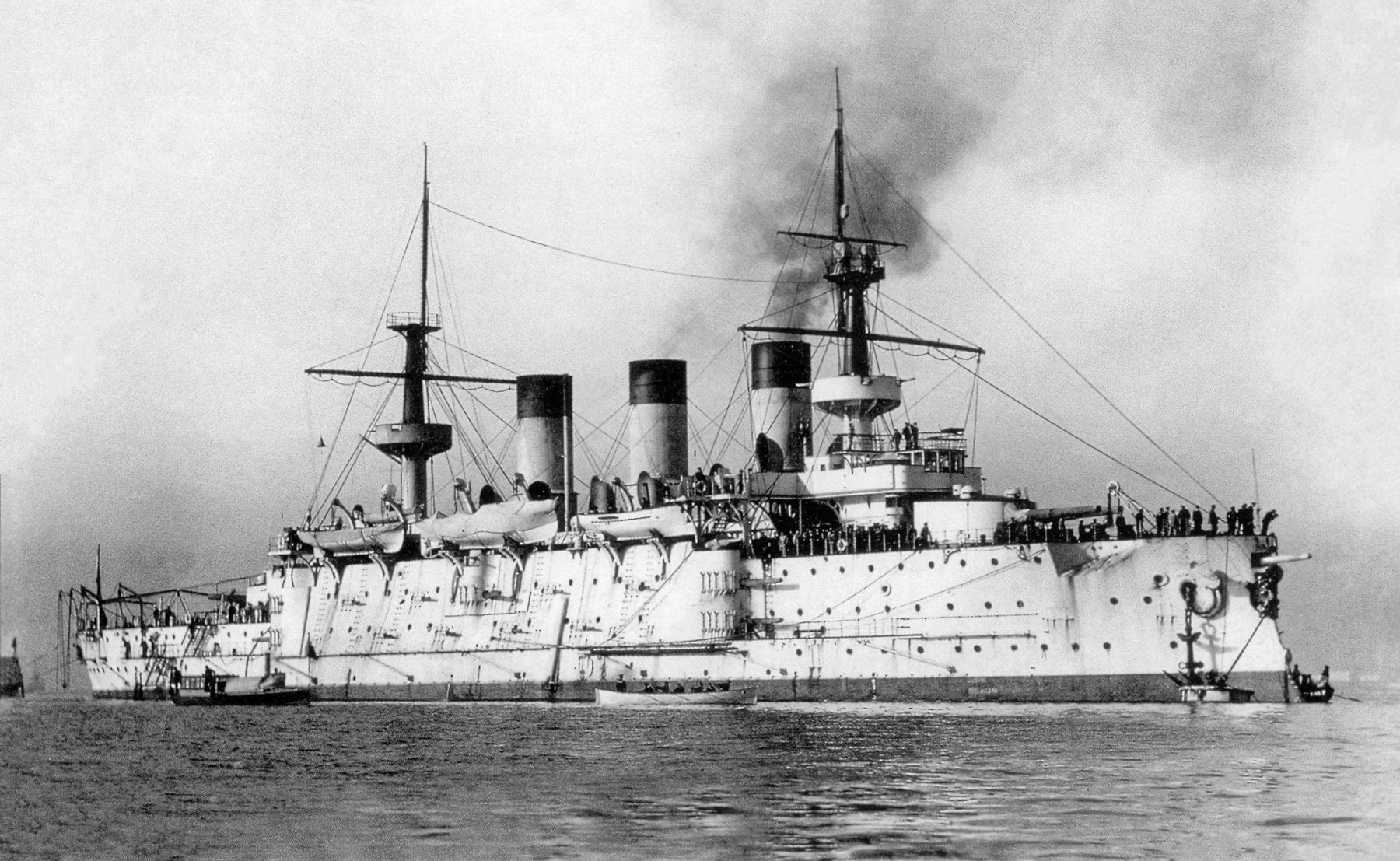
- Peresvet at anchor, 1901

Class overview
- Name: Peresvet
- Builders: Baltic Works, Saint Petersburg; New Admiralty Yard, Saint Petersburg
- Operators: Imperial Russian Navy; Imperial Japanese Navy
- Preceded by: Rostislav
- Succeeded by: Potemkin
- Subclasses: Pobeda
- Built: 1898–1903
- In commission: 1901–22
- Completed: 3
- Lost: 2
- Scrapped: 1

General characteristics
- Type: Pre-dreadnought battleship
- Displacement: 13,320–14,408 long tons (13,534–14,639 t)
- Length: 434 ft 5 in (132.4 m)
- Beam: 71 ft 6 in (21.8 m)
- Draft: 26 ft 3 in (8.0 m)
- Installed power: 14,500 ihp (10,813 kW); 30 Belleville boilers
- Propulsion: 3 shafts, 3 Vertical triple-expansion steam engines
- Speed: 18 knots (33 km/h; 21 mph)
- Range: 6,200 nmi (11,500 km; 7,100 mi) at 10 knots (19 km/h; 12 mph)
- Complement: 27 officers, 744 men
- Armament: 2 × twin 10 in (254 mm) guns; 11 × single 6 in (152 mm) guns; 20 × single 75 mm (3 in) guns; 20 × single 47 mm (1.9 in) guns; 8 × single 37 mm (1.5 in) guns; 5 × single 15 in (381 mm) torpedo tubes; 45 mines
- Armor: Belt: 7–9 inches (178–229 mm); Deck: 1.46–3 inches (37–76 mm); Turrets: 9 inches (229 mm)

The Peresvet class was a group of three pre-dreadnought battleships built for the Imperial Russian Navy around the end of the 19th century. Peresvet and Pobeda were transferred to the Pacific Squadron upon completion and based at Port Arthur from 1901 and 1903, respectively. All three ships were lost by the Russians in the Russo-Japanese War of 1904–05; Peresvet and Pobeda participated in the Battles of Port Arthur and the Yellow Sea and were sunk during the siege of Port Arthur. Oslyabya, the third ship, sailed to the Far East with the Second Pacific Squadron to relieve the Russian forces blockaded in Port Arthur and was sunk at the Battle of Tsushima with the loss of over half her crew.

Peresvet and Pobeda were salvaged after the Japanese captured Port Arthur and incorporated into the Imperial Japanese Navy. Peresvet was sold back to the Russians during World War I, as the two countries were by now allies, and sank after hitting German mines in the Mediterranean in early 1917 while Pobeda, renamed Suwo, remained instead in Japanese service and participated in the Battle of Tsingtao in late 1914. She became a gunnery training ship in 1917. The ship was disarmed in 1922 to comply with the terms of the Washington Naval Treaty and probably scrapped around that time.

== Design and description ==
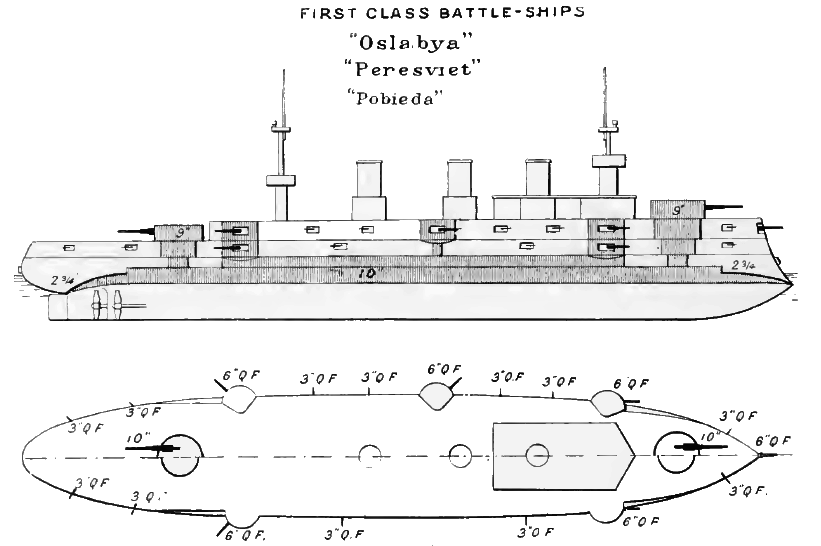
Right elevation and deck plan as depicted in Brassey's Naval Annual 1902

After the humiliating Russian defeat during the Crimean War of 1854–55, General Admiral Grand Duke Konstantin Nikolayevich understood that Russia would never be able to outbuild Britain or France, but still needed a maritime strategy that could defend Russia, give the fleet a useful role in peacetime and act as a deterrent. He decided that a guerre de course (commerce-raiding) strategy was Russia's only effective means of attacking the British Empire or France if war broke out and built a series of fast, long-range, armored cruisers like Rossia and Rurik to implement his strategy. The British responded by building the second-class battleships of the Centurion class to defeat the cruisers and the Russians countered with the three ships of the Peresvet class that were designed to support their armored cruisers. This role placed a premium on high speed and long range at the expense of heavy armament and armor.

As was common with Russian ships of the time, changes were made while the ships were under construction. The most important was the revision of the secondary armament from eight 6-inch (152 mm) and five 4.7-inch (119 mm) guns to eleven 6-inch guns and additional light guns. Only two ships were originally planned, but a third was ordered to keep the Baltic Works shipyard busy until a new design could be prepared. Ironically, it was completed before the second ship, despite having been laid down over three years later.

The Peresvet-class ships were 434 feet 5 inches (132.4 m) long overall, with a beam of 71 feet 6 inches (21.8 m) and a draft of 26 feet 3 inches (8.0 m). Designed to displace 12,674 long tons (12,877 t), they were 500–1,700 long tons (510–1,730 t) overweight and actually displaced 13,320–14,408 long tons (13,534–14,639 t). To reduce biofouling, the hulls of the first two ships were sheathed with wood and copper, but this was eliminated in Pobeda to reduce weight. The vessels had a partial double bottom and the hull was divided by 10 watertight transverse bulkheads; a centerline bulkhead divided the forward engine rooms. Each crew consisted of 27 officers and 744 enlisted men.

The ships were powered by three vertical triple-expansion steam engines, each driving one propeller shaft, using steam generated by 30 Belleville boilers. The engines were rated at 14,500 indicated horsepower (10,813 kW), using forced draft, and designed to reach a top speed of 18 knots (33 km/h; 21 mph). All three ships slightly exceeded their specifications and reached top speeds of 18.3–18.5 knots (33.9–34.3 km/h; 21.1–21.3 mph) from 14,532–15,578 indicated horsepower (10,837–11,617 kW) during their sea trials. They carried a maximum of 2,060 long tons (2,090 t) of coal which allowed them to steam for 6,200 nautical miles (11,500 km; 7,100 mi) at a speed of 10 knots (19 km/h; 12 mph). Their electrical equipment consisted of four steam-driven dynamos with a total capacity of 555 kilowatts (744 hp).

=== Armament ===
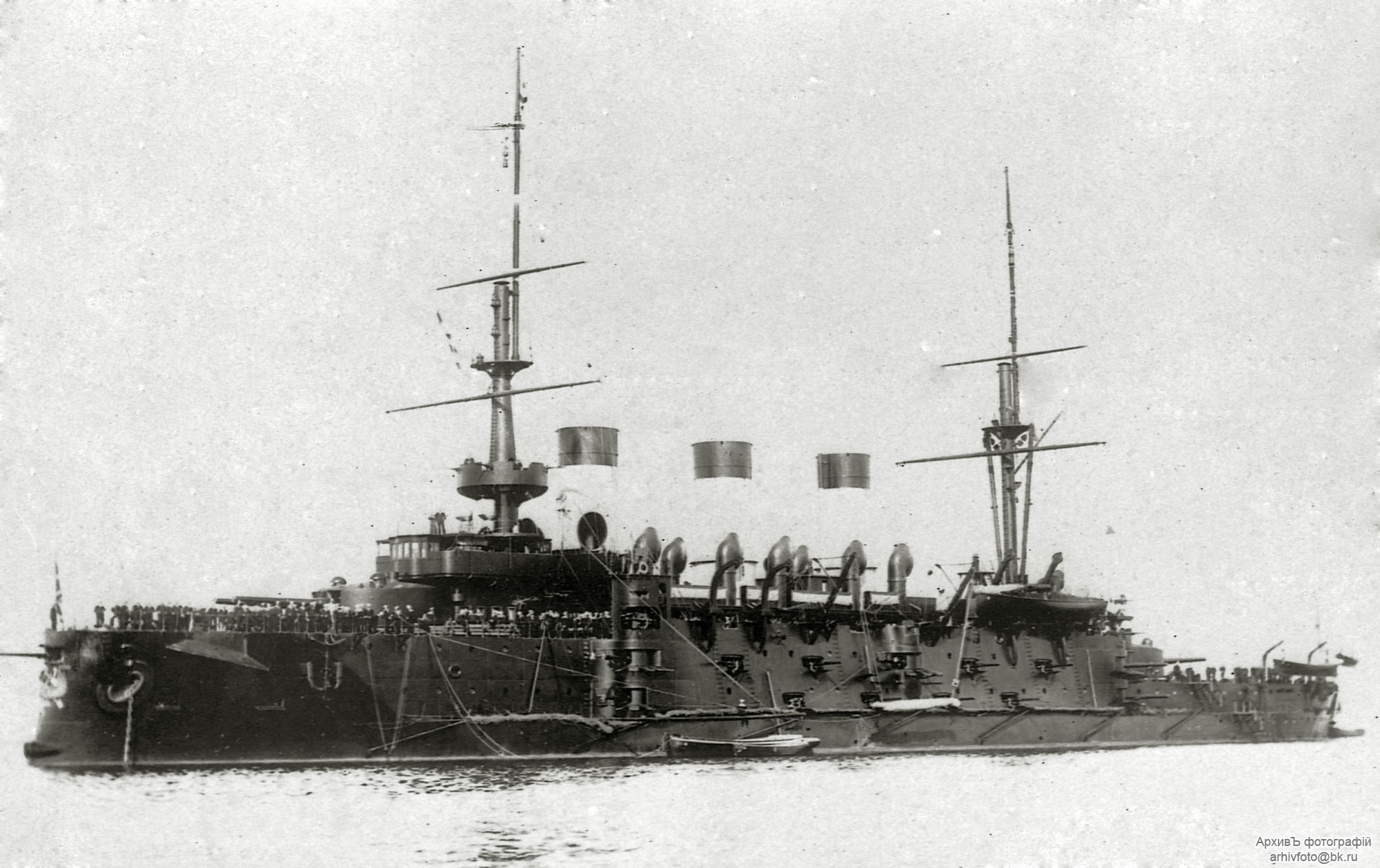
Oslyabya leaving Revel, October 1904

The ships' main battery consisted of four 45-caliber, 10-inch (254 mm) guns mounted in electrically powered twin-gun turrets, one forward and one aft of the superstructure. These guns had major development problems as they proved to be too weak to use a full-strength charge of propellant and had to be reworked and the charge reduced. The guns in Peresvet and Oslyabya were the original model and could be elevated to a maximum of +35°, while the reinforced guns used in Pobeda could only elevate to a maximum of +25°. The guns were designed to fire once every 40 seconds, but in service they fired at half that rate. The ships carried 75 rounds for each gun. The older guns fired a 496-pound (225.2 kg) shell at a muzzle velocity of 2,270 ft/s (692 m/s) while Pobeda's newer ones may have reached a muzzle velocity of 2,600 ft/s (790 m/s). At an elevation of +6°, the gun had a range of 8,760 yards (8,010 m). The secondary armament of the Peresvet-class ships consisted of eleven 45-caliber, 6-inch Canet Model 1891 quick-firing (QF) guns, 10 mounted in casemates on the sides of the hull and one underneath the forecastle as a bow chaser. Each gun was provided with 220 rounds. They fired shells that weighed 91 pounds (41.4 kg) with a muzzle velocity of 2,600 ft/s (792.5 m/s). They had a range of 12,602 yards (11,523 m) when fired at an elevation of +20°.

Smaller guns were carried for close-range defense against torpedo boats. These included 20 quick-firing (QF) 75-millimeter (3.0 in) Canet Model 1891 guns. Of these guns, eight were mounted in embrasures in the hull, four on the main deck, four on the battery deck and the last four at the corners of the superstructure on the forecastle deck. The ships carried 300 rounds for each gun. The gun had a muzzle velocity of 2,830 ft/s (862 m/s) with its 10.8-pound (4.91 kg) shells. It had a range of about 8,606 yards (7,869 m) at an elevation of +20°. The smaller guns included twenty QF 47-millimeter (1.9 in) Hotchkiss guns in hull embrasures and on the superstructure. Each gun had 810 rounds provided. They fired a 3.2-pound (1.5 kg) shell. Eight 37-millimeter (1.5 in) Hotchkiss guns were positioned between the 47-millimeter guns on the forecastle deck. They fired a 1.1-pound (0.50 kg) shell at a muzzle velocity of 1,540 ft/s (470 m/s).

The Peresvet class had five 15-inch (381 mm) torpedo tubes, three of which were above water, one in the bow and one pair of broadside tubes, and two broadside underwater tubes. The ships carried a total of 12 torpedoes. They also carried 45 mines to be laid to protect their anchorage in remote areas.

The ships were fitted with Liuzhol stadiametric rangefinders that used the angle between two vertical points on an enemy ship, usually the waterline and the crow's nest, to estimate the range. The gunnery officer consulted his references to get the range and calculated the proper elevation and deflection required to hit the target. He transmitted his commands via a Geisler electro-mechanical fire-control transmission system to each gun or turret. Oslyabya and the rest of the Second Pacific Squadron were also fitted with Perepelkin telescopic sights for their guns, but their crews were not trained in how to use them.

=== Protection ===
The first two ships used Harvey armor for most of their armored vertical surfaces except for the gun turrets and their support tubes, which were made from Krupp armor. Pobeda, however, used Krupp armor for all of her heavy vertical armor. Over the machinery spaces, the maximum thickness of their waterline armor belt was 9 inches (229 mm) which reduced to 7 inches (178 mm) abreast the magazines. The belt tapered to a thickness of 5 inches (127 mm) over the machinery spaces and 4 inches (102 mm) over the magazines. The belt covered 312 feet (95.1 m) of the ships' length and was 7 feet 9 inches (2.4 m) high, of which the upper 36 inches (914.4 mm) was intended to be above the waterline, but the ships were significantly overweight. So much of the belt was submerged that Peresvet only had 14 inches (356 mm) of armor exposed at normal load; at full load the effect was even greater and the belt was completely submerged. Oslyabya was even more overweight and only had 3 inches (76 mm) of her belt armor showing at normal load. The belt in both ships terminated in 7-inch transverse bulkheads, leaving the ends of the ships unprotected. The transverse bulkheads of the waterline belt in Pobeda were eliminated as the belt was extended to the ends of the ship with 4-inch armor plates. Above the waterline belt in all three ships was a shorter strake of armor that protected the middle of the ships. It was 188 feet (57.3 m) long and 4 inches thick. The ends of the upper belt were closed off by 4-inch angled transverse bulkheads.

The sides of the gun turrets were 9 inches thick and 2.5 inches (64 mm) of armor protected their roofs; their supporting tubes were 8 inches (203 mm) thick. The face of the casemates for the 6-inch guns was five inches thick and their rears were protected by 2-inch (51 mm) armor plates. The casemates at each end of the ships were protected by 5-inch transverse bulkheads. Bulkheads 0.75 inches (19 mm) thick separated the 75-millimeter gun positions. Peresvet had two conning towers, each with sides 6 inches thick, but the other two ships only had a forward conning tower with 9-inch sides. A communications tube 3 inches thick connected each conning tower to the armored deck in all three ships. The flat part of the deck in the central armored citadel consisted of a 1.46-inch (37 mm) plate over the normal 0.75-inch structural steel deck plate; the sloped portion connected to the lower edge of the waterline belt and was 2.5 inches thick. Outside the citadel the armored deck consisted of 2.25-inch (57 mm) plates laid over the 1 inch (25 mm) deck plating. On the first two ships the deck armor consisted of mild steel; in Pobeda it was a chrome-nickel steel alloy.

== Ships ==
Construction data
Ship	Builder	Laid down	Launched	Entered service	Cost
Peresvet (Пересвет)	Baltic Works, Saint Petersburg	21 November 1895 (Note: All dates used in this article are New Style)	19 May 1898	1901	10,540,000 rubles
Oslyabya (Ослябя)	New Admiralty Shipyard, Saint Petersburg	21 November 1895	8 December 1898	1903	11,340,000 rubles
Pobeda (Победа)	Baltic Works, Saint Petersburg	21 February 1899	10 May 1900	1902	10,050,000 rubles

== Careers ==
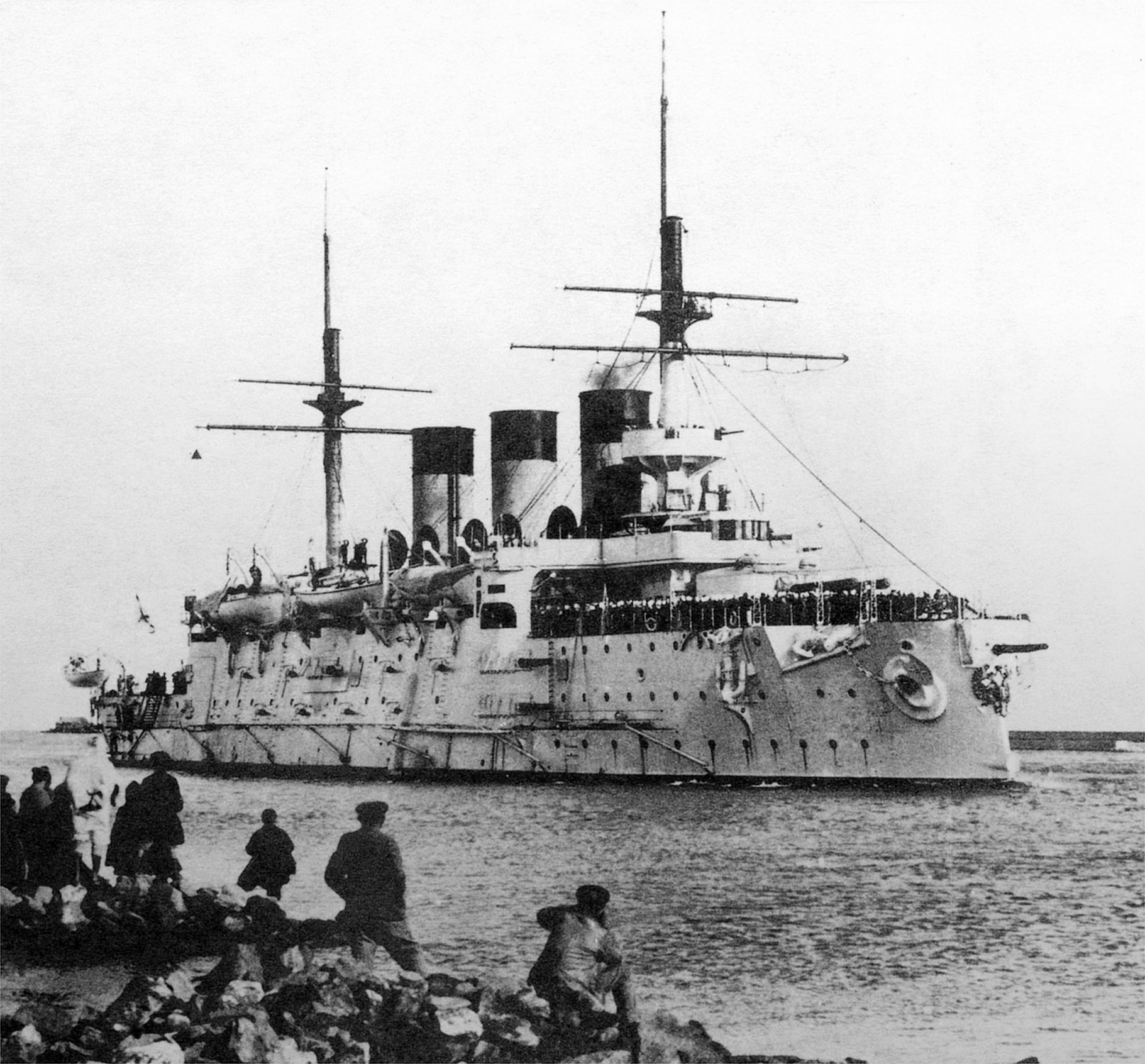
Oslyabya leaving Bizerte, Tunisia, 1903

Peresvet, named after Alexander Peresvet, a Russian monk who fought against the Golden Horde at the Battle of Kulikovo in 1380, and Pobeda (the Russian word pobeda means "victory") steamed to the Far East almost immediately after entering service in 1901 and 1902 respectively. Upon her arrival, Peresvet became the flagship of the squadron's second-in-command, Rear Admiral Prince Pavel Ukhtomsky. During the Battle of Port Arthur (February 1904) on the second day of the war, Peresvet was not hit, but Pobeda was hit once amidships, sustaining little damage but losing two men killed and four wounded. Pobeda struck a mine during the squadron's sortie on 13 April and remained under repair for almost two months. Both ships had some of their anti-torpedoboat guns and secondary armament removed during the summer to bolster the defenses of the port. They participated in the Battle of the Yellow Sea on 10 August 1904; Pobeda was only lightly damaged by 11 large-caliber hits, but Peresvet, hit 39 times, suffered a considerable amount of flooding. More guns were landed after the squadron's return to Port Arthur, but the Imperial Japanese Army captured the hills overlooking the harbor in November, and this allowed Japanese 28-centimeter (11 in) siege guns to fire directly at the Russian ships. Pobeda and Peresvet were hit many times, and Pobeda sank on 7 December 1904 from the accumulated damage. Peresvet was scuttled in shallow water on the same day.

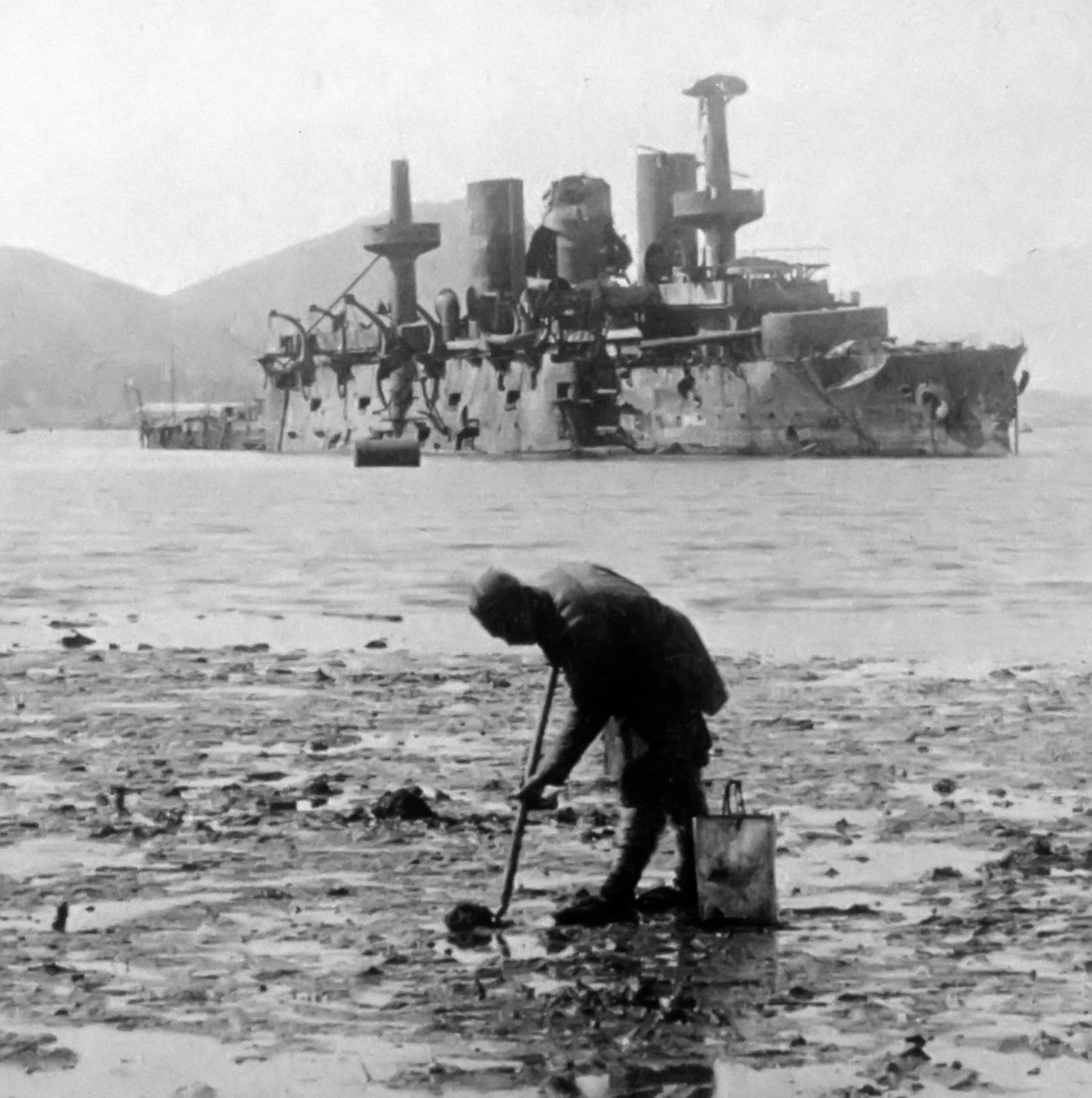
Peresvet scuttled in Port Arthur

Construction of Oslyabya, named after Rodion Oslyabya (another monk who had fought at the Battle of Kulikovo), was greatly delayed, and the ship found herself en route to the Far East when the Russo-Japanese War began in February 1904. She was ordered home and assigned to the Second Pacific Squadron that was intended to relieve the forces in Port Arthur. The ship served as the flagship of Rear Admiral Baron Dmitry von Fölkersam, second-in-command of the squadron, but he died two days before the Battle of Tsushima in May 1905. Oslyabya led the Second Division of the squadron during the battle and was the target of numerous Japanese ships during the early part of the battle. Many of the hits on the ship were along the waterline and caused extensive flooding. Efforts to counteract the resulting list destroyed her remaining stability and she sank just over an hour after the Japanese opened fire—the first modern battleship to be sunk solely by gunfire. Sources differ on the exact number of casualties, but the lowest figure given is 471. (Note: Campbell says that 385 survivors were rescued by Russian destroyers, but 514 men went down with the ship, while Forczyk agrees with McLaughlin.)

=== In Japanese service ===
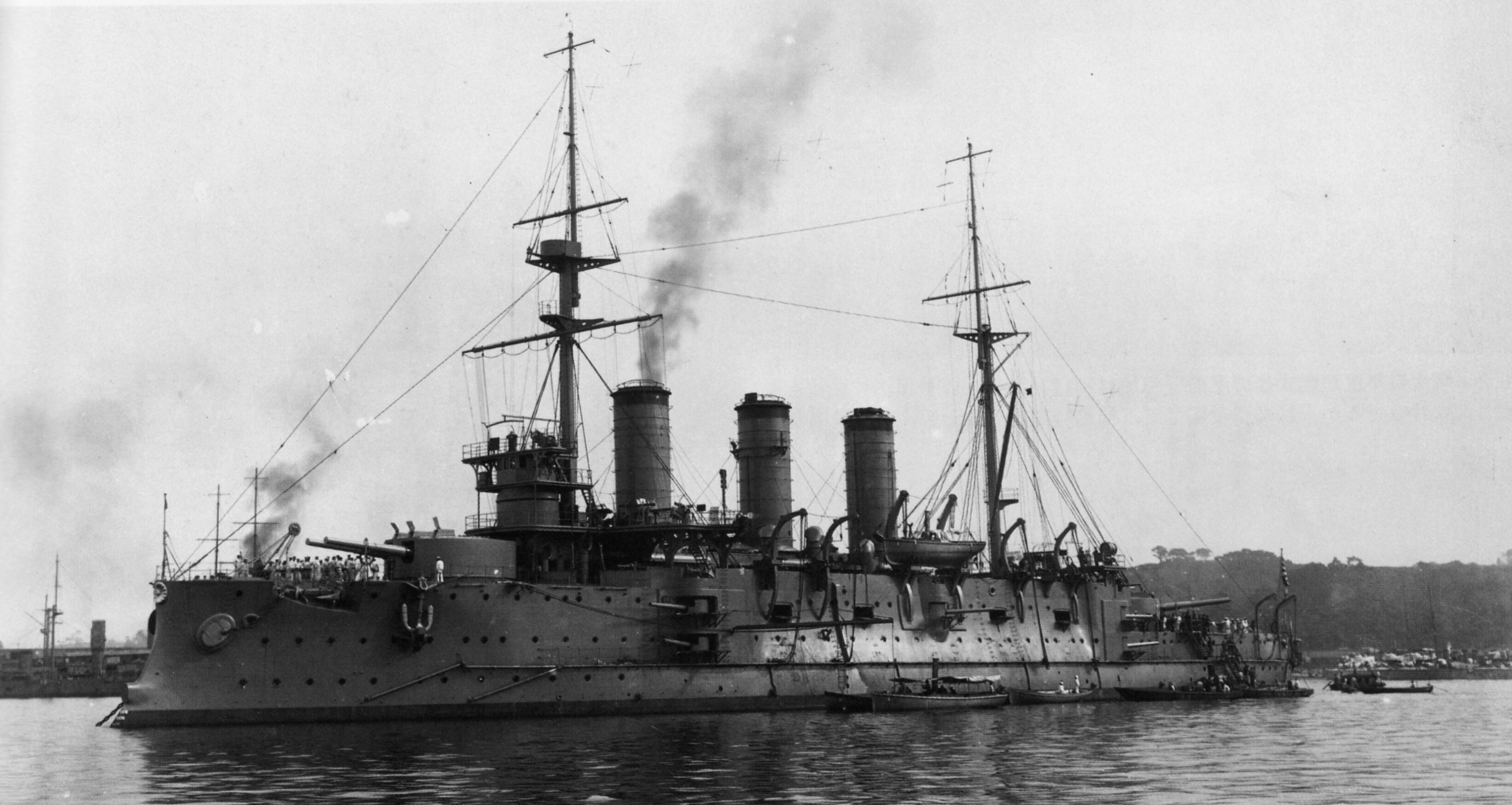
Suwo at anchor, Yokosuka, 10 October 1908

The Japanese raised, repaired, and rearmed Peresvet and Pobeda. They incorporated the refurbished vessels into the Imperial Japanese Navy as Sagami and Suwo, respectively, and reclassified them as first-class coastal defense ships. After the beginning of World War I in 1914, Sagami was sold to Russia in March 1916 and arrived in Vladivostok on 3 April 1916, where she resumed her former name of Peresvet. The Russian Navy intended the ship for service with the Russian Arctic flotilla, and Peresvet sailed for the Arctic, but struck two mines off Port Said, Egypt, on 4 January 1917. The mines, laid by the German submarine SM U-73, sank Peresvet with the loss of 167 lives after she had caught fire.

During World War I Suwo served as the flagship for the Japanese squadron during the siege of Tsingtao from 27 August to 7 November 1914. The ship served as flagship of the Second Squadron of the Second Fleet in 1915–1916 before becoming a gunnery-training ship for the rest of the war. In April 1922, in compliance with the Washington Naval Treaty, Suwo was disarmed at the Kure Naval Arsenal. During the removal of her armor, the ship capsized on 13 July. She was probably scrapped in 1922–1923, but at least one source suggests she was re-floated and hulked, serving until being broken up at Kure in 1946. (Note: Fukui Shinzo does not list her, however, in the authoritative Japanese Naval Vessels at the End of World War II.)
