= HMS Exmouth (1901) =

Pre-dreadnought battleship of the British Royal Navy

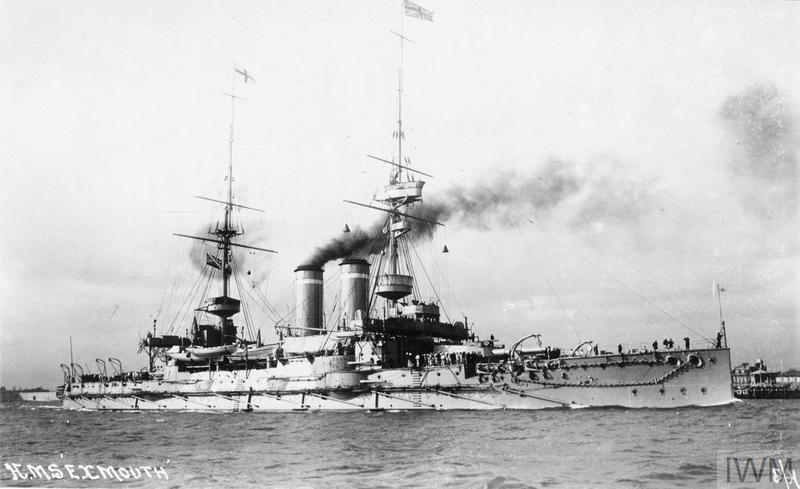
- Exmouth during WWI

History

United Kingdom
- Name: HMS Exmouth
- Namesake: Edward Pellew, 1st Viscount Exmouth
- Builder: Laird Brothers, Birkenhead
- Laid down: 10 August 1899
- Launched: 31 August 1901
- Completed: May 1903
- Commissioned: 2 June 1903
- Decommissioned: April 1919
- Fate: Sold for scrapping, 15 January 1920

General characteristics
- Class & type: Duncan-class pre-dreadnought battleship
- Displacement: Normal: 13,270 to 13,745 long tons (13,483 to 13,966 t); Full load: 14,900 to 15,200 long tons (15,100 to 15,400 t)
- Length: 432 ft (132 m) (loa)
- Beam: 75 ft 6 in (23.01 m)
- Draught: 25 ft 9 in (7.85 m)
- Installed power: 18,000 ihp (13,000 kW); 24 × Belleville water-tube boilers
- Propulsion: 2 × triple-expansion steam engines; 2 × screw propellers
- Speed: 19 knots (35 km/h; 22 mph)
- Range: 6,070 nmi (11,240 km; 6,990 mi) at 10 knots (19 km/h; 12 mph)
- Complement: 720
- Armament: 4 × 12-inch (305 mm) 40-caliber Mk IX guns; 12 × 6-inch (152 mm) 45-calibre guns; 10 × 12-pounder 3 in (76 mm) guns; 6 × 3-pounder 47 mm (1.9 in) guns; 4 × 18-inch (457 mm) torpedo tubes (submerged)
- Armour: Belt: 7 in (178 mm); Bulkheads: 11–7 in (279–178 mm); Decks: 2–1 in (51–25 mm); Turrets: 10–8 in (254–203 mm); Barbettes: 11–4 in (279–102 mm); Casemates: 6 in (152 mm); Conning tower: 12 in (305 mm)

HMS Exmouth was a Duncan-class pre-dreadnought battleship of the Royal Navy. Built to counter a group of fast Russian battleships, Exmouth and her sister ships were capable of steaming at 19 knots (35 km/h; 22 mph), making them the fastest battleships in the world. The Duncan-class battleships were armed with a main battery of four 12-inch (305 mm) guns and they were broadly similar to the London-class battleships, though of a slightly reduced displacement and thinner armour layout. As such, they reflected a development of the lighter second-class ships of the Canopus-class battleship. Exmouth was laid down by Laird Brothers at Birkenhead in August 1899, launched in August 1901, and completed in May 1903.

Exmouth served as a flagship for various fleets including the Mediterranean Fleet, the Channel Fleet and the Atlantic Fleet from her commissioning in 1903 until the start of the First World War in 1914. Originally she was to join the 6th Battle Squadron and serve in the Channel Fleet, but this squadron was temporarily disbanded and she joined the 3rd Battle Squadron at Scapa Flow. Exmouth participated in the Northern Patrol and was then moved to the newly reformed 6th Squadron in late 1914, where she bombarded the German-occupied port at Zeebrugge in late November.

In mid-1915, the ship was transferred to the Dardanelles campaign, where she supported operations ashore. She was thereafter moved to Greece and later to the East Indies Station starting in March 1917. She performed convoy escort duties in the Indian Ocean between Colombo and Bombay before returning to the United Kingdom, calling at The Cape and Sierra Leone. She arrived at Devonport in August 1917, and paid off to provide crews for antisubmarine vessels. Exmouth remained in reserve at Devonport until April 1919, and was used as an accommodation ship beginning in January 1918. She was placed on the sale list in April 1919 and sold for scrapping to Forth Shipbreaking Company on 15 January 1920.

== Design ==
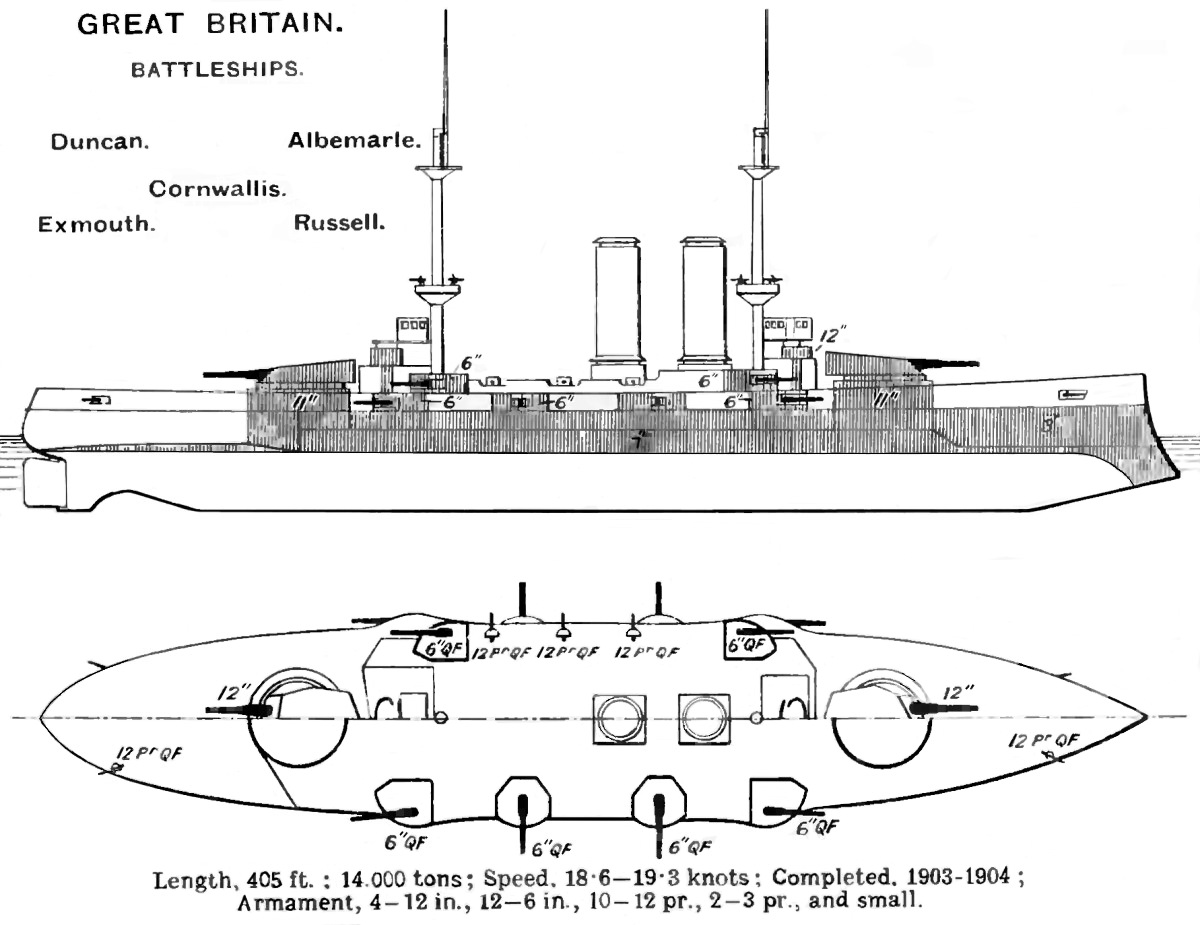
Right elevation and deck plan as depicted in Brassey's Naval Annual 1915

The six ships of the Duncan class were ordered in response to the Russian Peresvet-class battleships that had been launched in 1898. The Russian ships were fast second-class battleships, so William Henry White, the British Director of Naval Construction, designed the Duncan class to match the purported top speed of the Russian vessels. To achieve the higher speed while keeping displacement from growing, White was forced to reduce the ships' armour protection significantly, effectively making the ships enlarged and improved versions of the Canopus-class battleships of 1896, rather than derivatives of the more powerful Majestic, Formidable, and London series of first-class battleships. The Duncans proved to be disappointments in service, owing to their reduced defensive characteristics, though they were still markedly superior to the Peresvets they had been built to counter.

Exmouth was 432 feet (132 m) long overall, with a beam of 75 ft 6 in (23.01 m) and a draft of 25 ft 9 in (7.85 m). The Duncan-class battleships displaced 13,270 to 13,745 long tons (13,483 to 13,966 t) normally and up to 14,900 to 15,200 long tons (15,100 to 15,400 t) fully loaded. Her crew numbered 720 officers and ratings. The Duncan-class ships were powered by a pair of 4-cylinder triple-expansion engines that drove two screws, with steam provided by twenty-four Belleville boilers. The boilers were trunked into two funnels located amidships. The Duncan-class ships had a top speed of 19 knots (35 km/h; 22 mph) from 18,000 indicated horsepower (13,000 kW). This made Exmouth and her sisters the fastest battleships in the world for several years. At a cruising speed of 10 knots (19 km/h; 12 mph), the ship could steam for 6,070 nautical miles (11,240 km; 6,990 mi).

Exmouth had a main battery of four 12-inch (305 mm) 40-calibre guns mounted in twin-gun turrets fore and aft. The ships also mounted a secondary battery of twelve 6-inch (152 mm) 45-calibre guns mounted in casemates, in addition to ten 12-pounder 3 in (76 mm) guns and six 3-pounder 47 mm (1.9 in) guns for defence against torpedo boats. As was customary for battleships of the period, she was also equipped with four 18-inch (457 mm) torpedo tubes submerged in the hull.

Exmouth had an armoured belt that was 7 in (178 mm) thick; the transverse bulkhead on the aft end of the belt was 7 to 11 in (178 to 279 mm) thick. Her main battery turrets' sides were 8 to 10 in (203 to 254 mm) thick, atop 11 in (279 mm) barbettes, and the casemate battery was protected with 6 in of Krupp steel. Her conning tower had 12-inch-thick sides. She was fitted with two armoured decks, 1 and 2 in (25 and 51 mm) thick, respectively.

== Service history ==
=== Pre-First World War ===
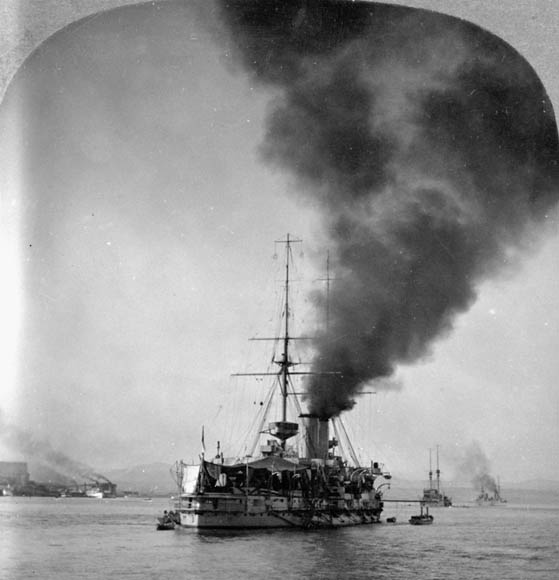
Exmouth in Canada in 1908 for the Quebec Tercentenary in 1908

HMS Exmouth was laid down by Laird Brothers at Birkenhead on 10 August 1899. She was floated out on 31 August 1901, when she was named by Lady Alice Stanley, wife of Lord Stanley, Financial Secretary to the War Office, who afterwards gave a speech. She arrived at the Nore in May 1902, and was armed and completed for sea at Chatham Dockyard. After delays due to labour problems, she was completed in May 1903. Exmouth commissioned at Chatham Dockyard on 2 June 1903 for service in the Mediterranean Fleet. She returned to the United Kingdom in May 1904, and on 18 May 1904 recommissioned as Flagship, Vice Admiral, Home Fleet, serving as flagship of Sir Arthur Wilson. When the Home Fleet was redesignated as the Channel Fleet, she continued to serve as the fleet flagship. She transferred her flag in April 1907, was reduced to a nucleus crew, and entered the commissioned reserve to begin a refit at Portsmouth Dockyard.

Her refit complete, she recommissioned on 25 May 1907 to serve as Flagship, Vice Admiral, Atlantic Fleet. In July 1908, Exmouth visited Canada during the Quebec Tercentenary, in company with her sister ships Albemarle, Duncan, and Russell. On 20 November 1908 she transferred to the Mediterranean Fleet to serve as flagship there, and underwent a refit at Malta in 1908–1909. Under a fleet reorganization of 1 May 1912, the Mediterranean Fleet became the 4th Battle Squadron, First Fleet, Home Fleet, and changed its base from Malta to Gibraltar. Exmouth became Flagship, Vice Admiral, Home Fleet, in July 1912. In December 1912, the battleship Dreadnought replaced Exmouth in the 4th Battle Squadron, and Exmouth began a refit at Malta. Upon completion of her refit, Exmouth recommissioned on 1 July 1913 at Devonport Dockyard with a nucleus crew to serve in the commissioned reserve with the 6th Battle Squadron, Second Fleet. She was assigned duties as a gunnery training ship at Devonport.

=== First World War ===
When the First World War began in August 1914, plans originally called for Exmouth and the battleships Agamemnon, Albemarle, Cornwallis, Duncan, Russell, and Vengeance to combine in the 6th Battle Squadron and serve in the Channel Fleet, where the squadron was to patrol the English Channel and cover the movement of the British Expeditionary Force to France. However, plans also existed for the 6th Battle Squadron to be assigned to the Grand Fleet, and, when the war began, the Commander-in-Chief, Grand Fleet, Admiral Sir John Jellicoe, requested that Exmouth and her four surviving sister ships of the Duncan class (Albemarle, Cornwallis, Duncan, and Russell) be assigned to the 3rd Battle Squadron in the Grand Fleet for patrol duties to make up for the Grand Fleet's shortage of cruisers. Accordingly, the 6th Battle Squadron was abolished temporarily, and Exmouth joined the 3rd Battle Squadron at Scapa Flow on 8 August 1914. Exmouth, Russel, and Albemarle were the only ships in a condition to immediately join Jellicoe, so they left without the rest of the squadron on 5 August. They arrived in Scapa Flow on the night of 7–8 August. Exmouth worked with the Grand Fleet's cruisers on the Northern Patrol.

In October, Exmouth went to Devonport for refit. When the Grand Fleet dreadnought battleship Audacious struck a mine north of Ireland on 27 October, Exmouth, which was moored in Lough Swilly, was sent to tow her to safety. By the time she arrived, however, Audacious had to be abandoned, and she shortly thereafter capsized and exploded. Exmouth and her four Duncan-class sisters, as well as the battleships of the King Edward VII class, temporarily were transferred to the Channel Fleet on 2 November 1914 to reinforce that fleet in the face of Imperial German Navy activity in the Channel Fleet's area. The following day, the German fleet raided Yarmouth; at the time, Exmouth and the rest of the 3rd Squadron were dispersed on the Northern Patrol, and were thus unavailable during the German attack.

On 13 November 1914, the King Edward VII-class ships returned to the Grand Fleet, but Exmouth and the other Duncans stayed in the Channel Fleet, where they reconstituted the 6th Battle Squadron on 14 November 1914. This squadron was given a mission of bombarding German submarine bases on the coast of Belgium, and was based at Portland, although it transferred to Dover immediately on 14 November 1914. However, due a lack of antisubmarine defenses at Dover, particularly after the harbour's anti-submarine boom was swept away in a gale, the squadron returned to Portland on 19 November 1914. Exmouth and Russell bombarded Zeebrugge, which was used by German submarines on passage from their base at Bruges, on 23 November 1914, The two ships left Portland on 21 November accompanied by eight destroyers, a group of trawlers, and a pair of airships to observe the fall of shot, though the airships failed to arrive in time for the operation. Exmouth and Russell closed to 6,000 yards (5,500 m) of the port and shelled the harbour, the railroad station, and coastal defences. The two ships fired some 400 shells in total and observed several fires ashore; reports from Dutch observers indicated significant damage had been inflicted, but the attack achieved very little and discouraged the Royal Navy from continuing such bombardments. The 6th Battle Squadron returned to Dover in December 1914, then transferred to Sheerness on 30 December 1914 to relieve the 5th Battle Squadron there in guarding against a German invasion of the United Kingdom.

==== Dardanelles campaign ====
Exmouth moored at Kephalo in 1915

Between January and May 1915, the 6th Battle Squadron was dispersed. Exmouth left the squadron when she transferred to the Dardanelles on 12 May 1915 for service in the Dardanelles campaign as Flagship, Rear Admiral, supporting squadron, flying the flag of Rear Admiral Nicholson. She steamed to the Mediterranean with the battleship Venerable; the British hoped to take advantage of the experience both ships' crews had gained in bombarding coastal positions in Belgium. She was fitted with extra-heavy anti-torpedo nets for this service. After the torpedoing and sinking of battleships HMS Goliath, HMS Triumph, and HMS Majestic, all within the space of two weeks in May 1915, she was the only battleship allowed to remain off the Gallipoli Peninsula beaches at Kephalo on the island of Imbros. This was a result of her heavy anti-torpedo nets, which were believed made it safer for her to remain on station than any of the other battleships.

On 4 June, Exmouth, the battleship Swiftsure, and the protected cruiser Talbot went to Cape Helles to support an Allied attack on the Turkish-held heights at Achi Baba. Reports of enemy submarines in the area forced the ships to steam in circles to avoid being targeted, which reduced their accuracy. The ground forces were unable to break through the Ottoman lines, so the attack was called off. By July, the anchorage at Kephalo had received an anti-submarine boom, which improved the security of Exmouth's station. She supported another Allied attack on the Ottoman positions at Achi Baba in August, which also failed.

==== Later operations ====
Exmouth left the Dardanelles in November 1915 and transferred to the Aegean Sea to become Flagship, 3rd Detached Squadron, a force based at Salonika that had been organized to assist the French Navy in blockading the Aegean coast of Greece and Bulgaria and to reinforce the Suez Canal Patrol. On 28 November 1915, she took aboard personnel of the British Belgrade Naval Force as they were being evacuated from Serbia. From September to December 1916 she served in the Allied force supporting Allied demands against the government of Greece, which at the time was ruled by the pro-German Constantine I, who had decided to remain neutral at the outbreak of war. In August 1916, a pro-Allied group launched a coup against the monarchy in the Noemvriana, which the Allies sought to support. Exmouth participated in the seizure of the Greek fleet at Salamis and landed Royal Marines at Athens on 1 December 1916. The British and French troops were defeated by the Greek Army and armed civilians and were forced to withdraw to their ships, after which the British and French fleet imposed a blockade of the royalist-controlled parts of the country.

Exmouth transferred to the East Indies Station in March 1917, where she performed convoy escort duties in the Indian Ocean between Colombo and Bombay. In June 1917, she ended this service to return to the United Kingdom, calling at Zanzibar, The Cape and Sierra Leone during the voyage. She arrived at Devonport in August 1917, and paid off to provide crews for antisubmarine vessels. Exmouth remained in reserve at Devonport until April 1919, and was used as an accommodation ship beginning in January 1918. Exmouth was placed on the sale list in April 1919 and sold for scrapping to Forth Shipbreaking Company on 15 January 1920. Her hull was scrapped in the Netherlands.
