= List of ship commissionings in 1904 =

The list of ship commissionings in 1904 includes a chronological list of all ships commissioned in 1904.

| Date | Operator | Ship | Flag | Class and type | Pennant | Other notes |
|---|---|---|---|---|---|---|
| 5 January | Imperial German Navy | Undine | | Gazelle-class cruiser | | |
| 12 January | Imperial German Navy | Prinz Adalbert | | Prinz Adalbert-class cruiser | | |
| 3 February | French Navy | Suffren | | Pre-dreadnought battleship | | |
| 9 February | Royal Navy | Cornwallis | | Duncan-class battleship | | |
| 8 March | Imperial German Navy | Hamburg | | Bremen-class cruiser | | |
| 7 April | Royal Navy | Queen | | London-class battleship | | |
| 13 April | Imperial German Navy | Schwaben | | Wittelsbach-class battleship | | |
| 15 April | Austro-Hungarian Navy | Babenberg | | Habsburg-class battleship | | |
| 18 May | Royal Navy | Prince of Wales | | London-class battleship | | |
| 19 May | Imperial German Navy | Bremen | | Bremen-class cruiser | | |
| 21 June | Royal Navy | Swiftsure | | Swiftsure-class battleship | | |
| 21 June | Royal Navy | Triumph | | Swiftsure-class battleship | | |
| 4 October | United States Navy | Ohio | | Maine-class battleship | BB-12 | |
| 15 October | Imperial German Navy | Braunschweig | | Braunschweig-class battleship | | |
| 29 November | Imperial German Navy | Elsass | | Braunschweig-class battleship | | |
| 3 December | Swedish Navy | Manligheten | | Äran-class coastal defence ship | | |
