= HMS Venerable (1899) =

Pre-dreadnought battleship of the British Royal Navy

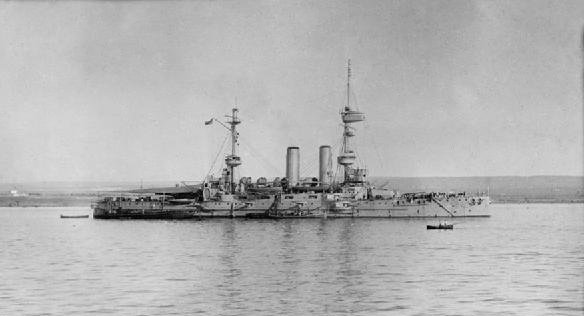
- HMS Venerable at Malta in 1915.

History

United Kingdom
- Name: HMS Venerable
- Builder: Chatham Dockyard
- Laid down: 2 January 1899
- Launched: 2 November 1899
- Completed: November 1902
- Commissioned: 12 November 1902
- Decommissioned: late December 1918
- Fate: Broken up, 1922

General characteristics
- Class & type: London-class battleship
- Displacement: Normal: 14,500 long tons (14,700 t); Full load: 15,700 long tons (16,000 t)
- Length: 431 ft 9 in (131.6 m) o/a
- Beam: 75 ft (22.9 m)
- Draught: 26 ft (7.9 m)
- Installed power: 20 × water-tube boilers; 15,000 ihp (11,000 kW)
- Propulsion: 2 × triple-expansion steam engines; 2 × screw propellers
- Speed: 18 knots (33 km/h; 21 mph)
- Complement: 714
- Armament: 4 × BL 12 in (305 mm) Mk IX guns; 12 × BL 6 in (152 mm) Mk VII guns; 16 × QF 12-pdr (3 in (76 mm)) guns; 6 × QF 3-pdr 47 mm (1.9 in) guns; 4 × 18 in (457 mm) submerged torpedo tubes
- Armour: Belt: 9 in (229 mm); Bulkhead: 9–12 in (229–305 mm); Barbettes: 12 in (305 mm); Turrets: 10 in (254 mm); Casemates: 6 in (152 mm); Conning tower: 14 in (356 mm); Deck: 1–2.5 in (25–64 mm)

HMS Venerable (1899) was a member of the London class of pre-dreadnought battleships built for the British Royal Navy. The Londons were near repeats of the preceding Formidable-class battleships, but with modified armour protection. Venerable's main battery consisted of four 12-inch (305-mm) guns, and she had top speed of 18 knots (33 km/h; 21 mph). The ship was laid down in January 1899, was launched in November that year, and was completed in November 1902. Commissioned that month, Venerable served in the Mediterranean Fleet until 1908, and was subsequently recommissioned into the Channel Fleet. Following a major refit in 1909, she served with the Atlantic and Home Fleets.

After the outbreak of World War I, she took part in defensive and offensive operations with the Channel Fleet, shelling German positions in Belgium through May 1915. Thereafter transferred to the Mediterranean, she saw service in the Dardanelles campaign in mid-1915, and then in the Adriatic through 1916. That December, she returned to England and was refitted as a depot ship in 1918. She was sold for scrap in 1921 and was ultimately broken up in 1922.

== Design ==
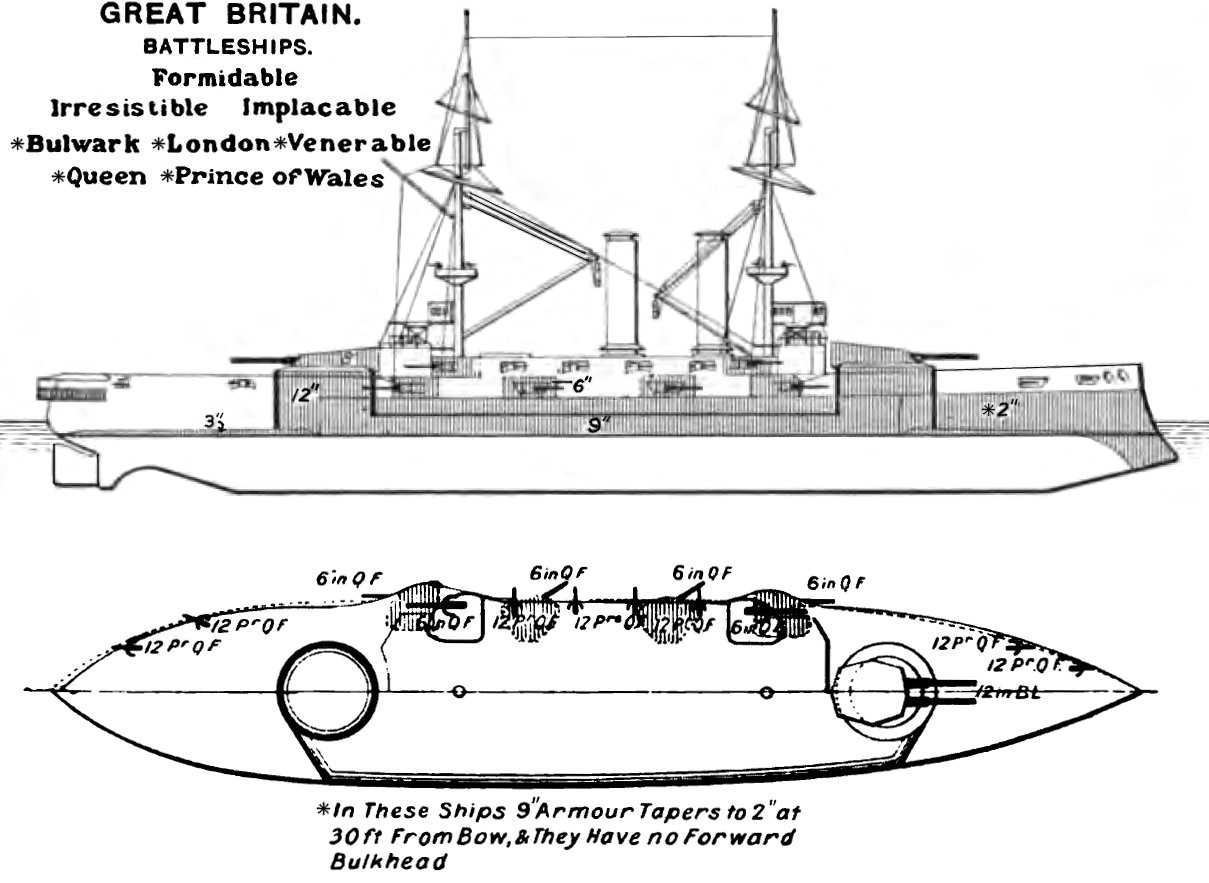
Line-drawing of the Formidable class; the Londons were identical in appearance

The five ships of the London class were ordered in 1898 in response to increased naval construction for the Russian Navy. The design for the London class was prepared in 1898; it was a virtual repeat of the preceding Formidable class, though with significant revision to the forward armour protection scheme. Rather than a traditional transverse bulkhead for the forward end of the main belt armour, the belt was carried further forward and gradually tapered in thickness. Deck armour was also strengthened.

Venerable was 431 feet 9 inches (131.60 m) long overall, with a beam of 75 ft (22.9 m) and a draught of 26 ft (7.9 m). She displaced 14,500 long tons (14,700 t) normally and up to 15,700 long tons (16,000 t) fully loaded. Her crew numbered 714 officers and enlisted men. The Formidable-class ships were powered by a pair of 3-cylinder triple-expansion engines, with steam provided by twenty Belleville boilers. The boilers were trunked into two funnels located amidships. The Formidable-class ships had a top speed of 18 knots (33 km/h; 21 mph) from 15,000 indicated horsepower (11,000 kW).

Venerable had a main battery of four 12-inch (305 mm) 40-calibre guns mounted in twin-gun turrets fore and aft; these guns were mounted in circular barbettes that allowed all-around loading or elevation. The ships also mounted a secondary battery of twelve 6-inch (152 mm) 45-calibre guns mounted in casemates, in addition to sixteen 12-pounder guns and six 3-pounder guns for defence against torpedo boats. As was customary for battleships of the period, she was also equipped with four 18-inch (457 mm) torpedo tubes submerged in the hull. The tubes were placed on the broadside, abreast of the main battery barbettes.

Venerable had an armoured belt that was 9 inches (229 mm) thick; the transverse bulkheads on the aft end of the belt was 9 to 12 in (229 to 305 mm) thick. Her main battery turrets sides were 8 to 10 in (203 to 254 mm) thick, atop 12 in (305 mm) barbettes, and the casemate battery was protected with 6 in of Krupp steel. Her conning tower had 14 in (356 mm) thick sides as well. She was fitted with two armoured decks, 1 and 2.5 in (25 and 64 mm) thick, respectively.

== Service history ==
=== Pre-First World War ===
HMS Venerable was laid down at Chatham Dockyard on 2 January 1899, launched on 2 November 1899, and completed in November 1902. After many delays due to difficulties with her machinery contractors, HMS Venerable commissioned on 12 November 1902 by Captain George Edwin Patey for service as Second Flagship, Rear Admiral, Mediterranean Fleet. She left Chatham on 20 November, called at Sheerness to adjust compasses, and arrived at the Mediterranean the following month. In 1903, she had an experimental fire control system for evaluation. During her Mediterranean service, she ran aground outside Algiers harbor, suffering slight hull damage, and underwent a refit at Malta in 1906–1907. On 12 August 1907 she was relieved as flagship by battleship HMS Prince of Wales, and her Mediterranean service ended on 6 January 1908, when she paid off at Chatham Dockyard.

Venerable recommissioned on 7 January 1908 for Channel Fleet service. She paid off at Chatham for an extensive refit in February 1909, during which her 3-pounder guns were removed and a rangefinder was installed on her foremast. The refit complete, Venerable recommissioned on 19 October 1909 for service in the Atlantic Fleet. On 13 May 1912 she transferred to the Second Home Fleet at the Nore, and went into the commissioned reserve with a nucleus crew as part of the 5th Battle Squadron. In 1913, her anti-torpedo nets were removed and a pair of searchlights were installed on her forward bridge.

=== First World War ===
When the First World War broke out in August 1914, the 5th Battle Squadron was assigned to the Channel Fleet, based at Portland. Returning to full commission, Venerable patrolled the English Channel, and on 25 August 1914 covered the movement of the Portsmouth Marine Battalion to Ostend, Belgium, In October 1914, Venerable was attached to the Dover Patrol for bombardment duties in support of Allied troops fighting on the front. She bombarded German positions along the Belgian coast between Westende and Lombardsijde from 26 to 30 October 1914 during a German attack on Belgian defences in the Battle of the Yser; she also served as the flagship of the Commander-in-Chief, Dover Patrol, Rear Admiral Sir Horace Hood, from 27 to 29 October. On the 27th, German field guns were moved up close to shore, which forced most of the light vessels to retreat, though the heavily armoured Venerable remained on station until reports of a German U-boat in the area prompted Hood to withdraw to Dunkirk. Venerable was back on station on 28 October, along with the gunboat Bustard and three monitors, to blunt another German attack. Later that day, she ran lightly aground on an uncharted sandbank, but was at that time out of range of German guns and was able to free herself with help from Brilliant at high tide. By the end of the month, the flooding from the opened sluices around Nieuwpoort had blocked the German advance, diverting German attacks further inland, out of range of Venerable's guns. The German guns along the coast had by this time been hidden, which made it far more difficult to engage them with naval gunfire, so Venerable was recalled.

On 3 November, she was detached to support East Coast Patrols during the German raid on Yarmouth, though she did not see action with German warships. The 5th Battle Squadron transferred from Portland to Sheerness on 14 November 1914 to guard against a possible German invasion of the United Kingdom. The squadron returned to Portland on 30 December 1914. Venerable, in company with the tender Excellent and escorting destroyers and minesweepers, again bombarded German positions near Westende on 11 March 1915. The bombardment was meant to divert German attention during the British attack at the Battle of Neuve Chapelle. She returned again on 10 May in an attempt to suppress German artillery that had been shelling Dunkirk, but German counter-battery fire prevented Venerable from dropping anchor or achieving any success.

On 12 May 1915, Venerable was ordered to the Dardanelles to replace the battleship HMS Queen Elizabeth in the Dardanelles Campaign. She steamed to the Mediterranean with the battleship Exmouth; the British hoped to take advantage of the experience both ships' crews had gained in bombarding coastal positions in Belgium. From 14 August 1915 to 21 August 1915, she supported Allied attacks on Ottoman positions at Suvla Bay. By the 21st, weather conditions worsened significantly, preventing the ships from being able to observe targets. In October, Venerable arrived at Gibraltar for a refit. Emerging from the refit in December 1915, she transferred to the Adriatic Sea to reinforce the Italian Navy against the Austro-Hungarian Navy, serving there until December 1916.

Venerable then returned to the United Kingdom, arriving at Portsmouth Dockyard on 19 December 1916, where she was laid up. In February and March 1918 she was refitted there as a depot ship, and she moved to Portland on 27 March 1918 to serve as a depot ship for minelaying trawlers. She was attached to the Northern Patrol through August 1918, then to the Southern Patrol from September to December 1918. Venerable paid off into care and maintenance at Portland at the end of December 1918. She was placed on the disposal list there in May 1919 and on the sale list on 4 February 1920. She was sold for demolition on 4 June 1920 to the Stanlee Shipbreaking & Salvage Company, who removed the engines, metal-work and upper decks at Dover. The bare hull was resold to the Slough Trading Company in mid-1922 for breaking up in Germany, and was towed from Dover on 20 June.
