= HMS London (1899) =

Pre-dreadnought battleship of the British Royal Navy

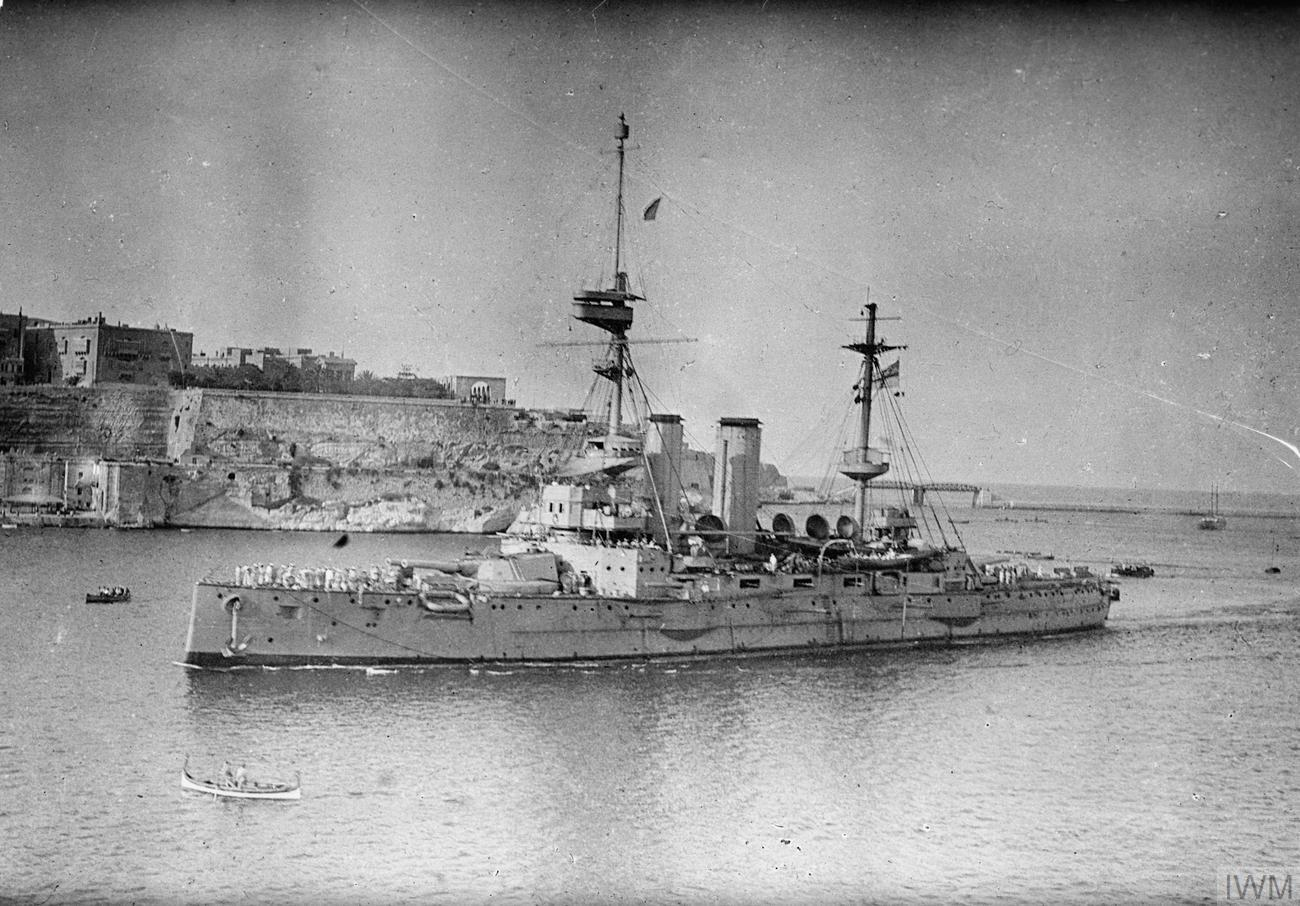
- HMS London entering Malta Harbour in 1915

History

United Kingdom
- Name: HMS London
- Builder: Portsmouth Dockyard
- Laid down: 8 December 1898
- Launched: 21 September 1899
- Completed: June 1902
- Commissioned: 7 June 1902
- Decommissioned: January 1919
- Fate: Broken up, 1922

General characteristics
- Class & type: London-class battleship
- Displacement: Normal: 14,500 long tons (14,700 t); Full load: 15,700 long tons (16,000 t)
- Length: 431 ft 9 in (131.6 m) o/a
- Beam: 75 ft (22.9 m)
- Draught: 26 ft (7.9 m)
- Installed power: 20 × water-tube boilers; 15,000 ihp (11,000 kW)
- Propulsion: 2 × triple-expansion steam engines; 2 × screw propellers
- Speed: 18 knots (33 km/h; 21 mph)
- Complement: 714
- Armament: 4 × BL 12-inch (305-mm) Mk IX guns; 12 × BL 6 in (152 mm) Mk VII guns; 16 × QF 12-pounder guns; 6 × QF 3-pounder guns; 4 × 18-inch (457-mm) submerged torpedo tubes
- Armour: Belt: 9 in (229 mm); Bulkhead: 9–12 in (229–305 mm); Barbettes: 12 in (305 mm); Turrets: 10 in (254 mm); Casemates: 6 in (152 mm); Conning tower: 14 in (356 mm); Deck: 1–2.5 in (25–64 mm)

HMS London was the lead ship of the London class of pre-dreadnought battleships built for the British Royal Navy. The Londons were near repeats of the preceding Formidable-class battleships, but with modified armour protection. The ship was laid down in December 1898, was launched in September 1899, and was completed in June 1902. Commissioned the same month, she served with the Mediterranean Fleet until early 1907. She was assigned to the Nore Division of the Home Fleet for nearly a year before transferring to the Channel Fleet. Rendered obsolete with the emergence of the new dreadnoughts in late 1906, she underwent an extensive refit in 1909, after which she served with the Atlantic Fleet. She was assigned to the Second Home Fleet in 1912 as part of the 5th Battle Squadron, and was temporarily fitted with a makeshift ramp for experiments with naval aircraft until 1913.

Following the outbreak of the First World War, the squadron was attached to the Channel Fleet before London was detached in March 1915 to participate in the Dardanelles Campaign, supporting ANZAC forces as they landed at Gaba Tepe and Anzac Cove on 25 April 1915. She remained in the Mediterranean, supporting the Italian Royal Navy in the Adriatic Sea until October 1916. Returning to the United Kingdom, she was inactive until being converted to a minelayer in early 1918, which entailed the removal of her main armament. She served with the Grand Fleet's 1st Minelaying Squadron until the end of the war. Placed in reserve in 1919, she was eventually broken up for scrap in 1920.

== Design ==
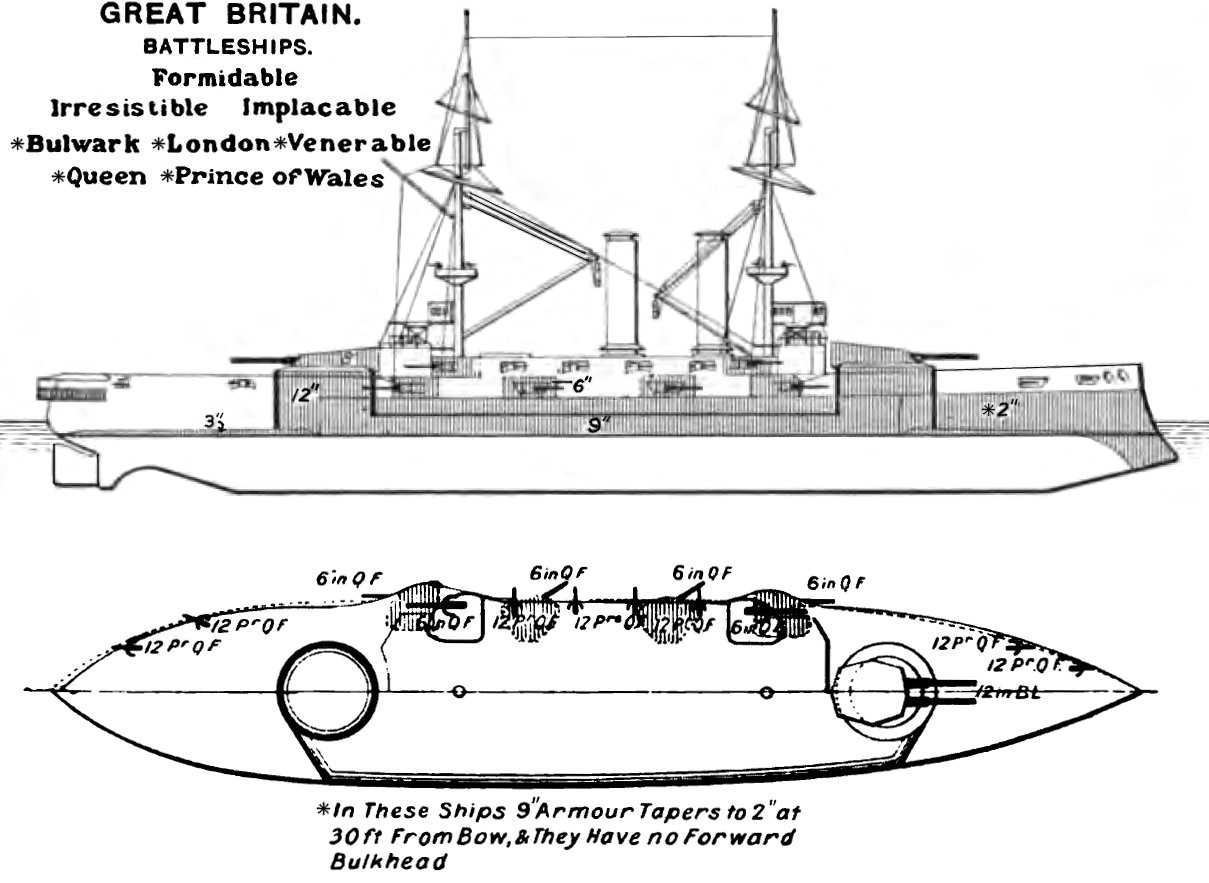
Line-drawing of the Formidable class; the Londons were identical in appearance.

The five ships of the London class were ordered in 1898 in response to increased naval construction for the Russian Navy. The design for the London class was prepared in 1898; it was a virtual repeat of the preceding Formidable class, though with significant revision to the forward armour protection scheme. Rather than a traditional transverse bulkhead for the forward end of the main belt armour, the belt was carried further forward and gradually tapered in thickness. Deck armour was also strengthened.

London was 431 feet 9 inches (131.60 m) long overall, with a beam of 75 ft (23 m) and a draft of 26 ft (7.9 m). She displaced 14,500 long tons (14,700 t) normally and up to 15,700 long tons (16,000 t) fully loaded. Her crew numbered 714 officers and ratings. The Formidable-class ships were powered by a pair of 3-cylinder triple-expansion engines that drove two screws, with steam provided by twenty Belleville boilers. The boilers were trunked into two funnels located amidships. The Formidable-class ships had a top speed of 18 knots (33 km/h; 21 mph) from 15,000 indicated horsepower (11,000 kW).

London had a main battery of four 12-inch (305 mm) 40-calibre guns mounted in twin-gun turrets fore and aft; these guns were mounted in circular barbettes that allowed all-around loading or elevation. The ships also mounted a secondary battery of twelve 6-inch (152 mm) 45-calibre guns mounted in casemates, in addition to sixteen 12-pounder guns and six 3-pounder guns for defence against torpedo boats. As was customary for battleships of the period, she was also equipped with four 18-inch (457 mm) torpedo tubes submerged in the hull. The tubes were placed on the broadside, abreast of the main battery barbettes.

London had an armoured belt that was 9 inches (229 mm) thick; the transverse bulkheads on the aft end of the belt was 9 to 12 in (229 to 305 mm) thick. Her main battery turrets sides were 8 to 10 in (203 to 254 mm) thick, atop 12 in (305 mm) barbettes, and the casemate battery was protected with 6 in of Krupp steel. Her conning tower had 14 in (356 mm) thick sides as well. She was fitted with two armoured decks, 1 and 2.5 in (25 and 64 mm) thick, respectively.

== Service history ==
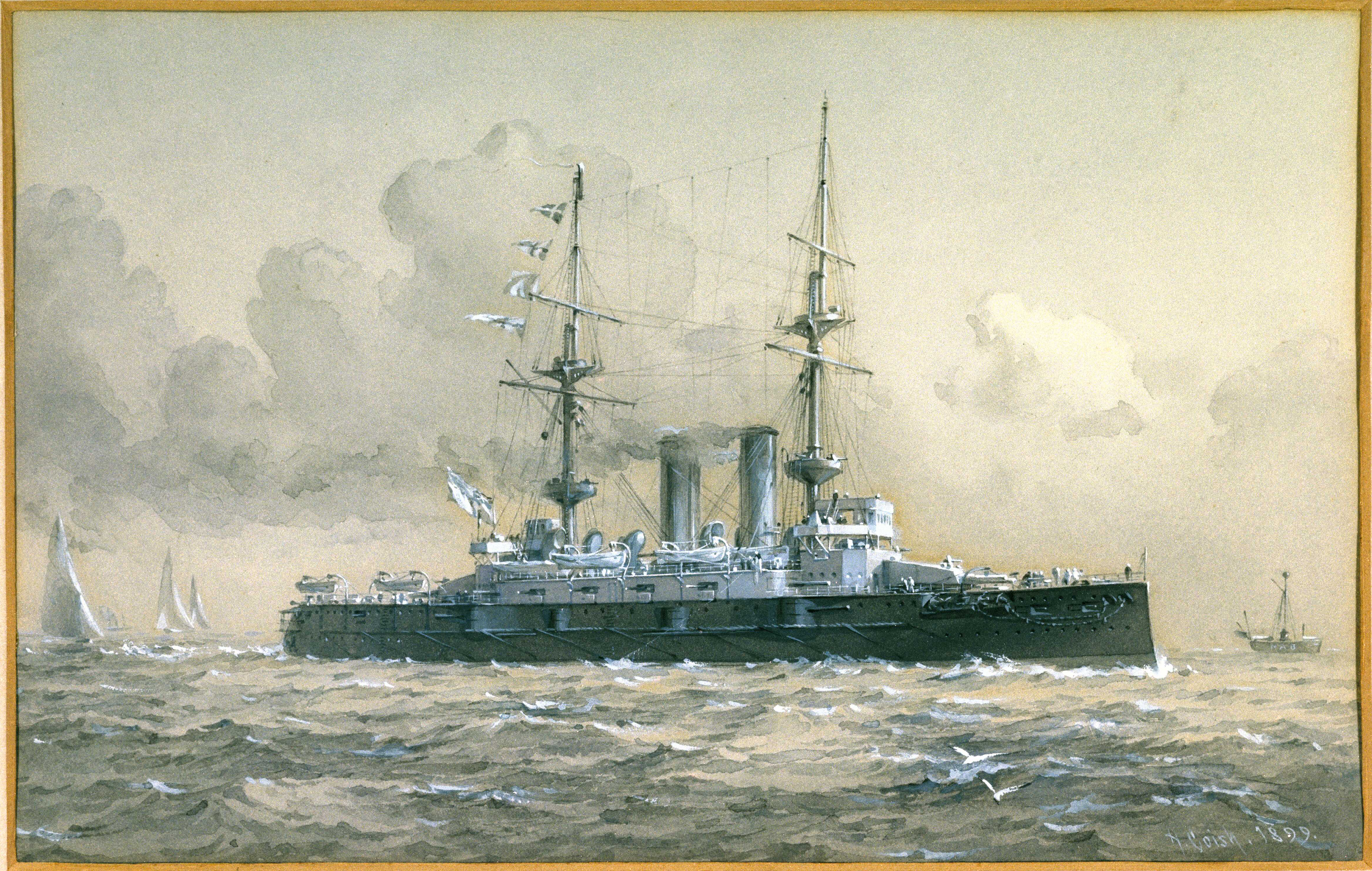
Painting of London in 1899

HMS London was laid down at Portsmouth Dockyard on 8 December 1898, launched on 21 September 1899, and completed in June 1902. London commissioned at Portsmouth Dockyard on 7 June 1902 for service in the Mediterranean Fleet, with Captain James Goodrich in command. Before departure from home waters, she was scheduled to serve as flagship for the Coronation Review for King Edward VII at Spithead planned for 28 June 1902, but the King fell ill and the coronation and review was rescheduled for August 1902, without the London. She thus left Portsmouth in early July, stopping at Gibraltar, and arrived at Malta on 14 July. In September 1902 she visited the Aegean Sea with other ships of the station for combined manoeuvres near Nauplia, and in February 1903 she left Malta for Platanias, accompanied by HMS Illustrious, HMS Caesar and HMS Myrmidon. While in the Mediterranean, she underwent refits at Malta in 1902–1903 and 1906. Starting in 1905, the ship began to have her 3-pounder guns gradually removed.

In March 1907, London transferred to the Nore Division, Home Fleet, at the Nore, then to the Channel Fleet on 2 June 1908, serving as Flagship, Rear Admiral, Channel Fleet. She underwent a refit at Chatham Dockyard in 1908, which included the transfer of her last two 3-pounder guns from her foremast to her aft bridge and a flying bridge was installed aft. She was paid off there on 19 April 1909 to undergo another extensive refit, which saw the removal of the flying bridge. Her refit complete, London commissioned at Chatham on 8 February 1910 to serve as Second Flagship, Rear Admiral, Atlantic Fleet. Later that year, she had the last two of her 3-pounder guns removed. Under the fleet reorganisation of 1 May 1912, she became part of the Second Home Fleet at the Nore, reduced to a nucleus crew and assigned to the 3rd Battle Squadron.

She collided with the merchant steamer SS Don Benite on 11 May 1912. She transferred to the 5th Battle Squadron and was used in experiments with flying off aircraft from May 1912 until 1913, employing a ramp built over her forecastle which had been transferred from the battleship Hibernia. During these experiments, Commander Charles Rumney Samson—who had made the world's first takeoff from a moving ship in May 1912 from Hibernia using a Short Improved S.27 biplane and the same ramp—repeated his feat by taking off in the same aeroplane from London on 4 July 1912 while London was underway. In 1913, London had her anti-torpedo nets removed.

=== First World War ===
Illustration of London firing a broadside

Upon the outbreak of the First World War in August 1914, the 5th Battle Squadron was assigned to the Channel Fleet and based at Portland. Their first task was to escort the British Expeditionary Force across the English Channel. A number of experimental paint schemes were tried during the first month of the war but these were quickly abandoned in favour of battleship grey. It was briefly planned to deploy the squadron to replace the ships lost during the action of 22 September 1914 but the orders to transfer to the Medway were rescinded. The squadron transferred to Sheerness on 14 November 1914 to guard against a possible German invasion. While there, London was present when the battleship Bulwark exploded. London's crew joined in the attempts to rescue survivors. The enquiry into the explosion was carried out aboard London. The squadron returned to Portland on 30 December 1914.

In January 1915, the British and French navies began to draw ships to the eastern Mediterranean to begin operations against the Ottoman Empire, including several ships from the 5th Battle Squadron. By the end of the month, only London, the battleships Queen, Prince of Wales, and Implacable, and the light cruisers Topaze and Diamond were at Portland. In March 1915, as the British and French fleets waging the Dardanelles campaign were preparing to launch a major attack on 18 March, the overall commander, Admiral Sackville Carden, requested two more battleships of the 5th Squadron, Implacable and Queen, to be transferred to his command in the expectation of losses in the coming operation. By the time they arrived, the British had lost two battleships in the 18 March attack, prompting the Admiralty to finally disband 5th Squadron and send London and Prince of Wales to join the fleet. Before they departed, they were modified slightly for operations off the Dardanelles, including the installation of a pair of 3-pounder anti-aircraft guns on their quarterdecks and the re-installation of anti-torpedo nets.

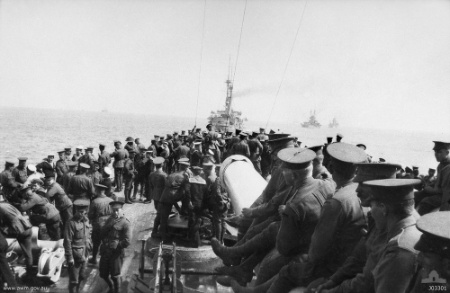
Australian troops on board London heading for Gallipoli, 24 April 1915

London arrived at Lemnos on 23 March 1915, and over the next month, she took part in preparations of the British and French fleet for the landings at Cape Helles and at Anzac Cove, the beginning of the land portion of the Gallipoli Campaign. On her arrival in the eastern Mediterranean, London joined the 2nd Squadron, commanded by Rear Admiral Cecil Thursby. She supported the main landings at Gaba Tepe and Anzac Cove on 25 April 1915. London arrived off the landing beach at about midnight, along with Queen and Prince of Wales; they were tasked with supporting the landing of the 3rd Australian Brigade. London covered the left side of the beach. Over the course of the landing, London and the other covering ships provided covering fire as the ANZAC troops advanced inland and helped to suppress Ottoman artillery.

London, along with battleships Implacable, Queen, and Prince of Wales, was transferred to the 2nd Detached Squadron, organised to reinforce the Italian Navy in the Adriatic Sea when Italy declared war on Austria-Hungary. She was based at Taranto, Italy, and underwent a refit at Gibraltar in October 1915 during her Adriatic service. In October 1916, London returned to the United Kingdom, paid off at Devonport Dockyard to provide crews for antisubmarine vessels, and was laid up. While inactive, she underwent a refit in 1916–1917. The work included removing her main deck 6-inch guns and the upper deck 12-pounder guns and moving four of the 6-inch weapons to the upper deck battery where the 12-pounder guns had been located.

In February 1918, London moved to Rosyth and began conversion to a minelayer. The conversion included removal of all four of her 12-inch (305-mm) guns and her anti-torpedo nets, replacement of her after main-battery turret with a 6-inch gun, and installation of minelaying equipment on her quarterdeck, including rails for 240 mines, and of a canvas screen to conceal the entire quarterdeck from external view. She also received an experimental dazzle camouflage paint scheme. The conversion was completed in April 1918, and on 18 May 1918 London recommissioned at Rosyth for service in the Grand Fleet's 1st Minelaying Squadron. Before the war ended on 11 November 1918, London had laid 2,640 mines in the Northern Mine Barrage.

=== Postwar ===
In January 1919, London was reduced to reserve at Devonport as a depot ship and repainted gray. As part of a post-war fleet organisation, she was assigned to the 3rd Fleet there. London was placed on the disposal list at Devonport in January 1920, and on the sale list on 31 March 1920. She was sold for demolition on 4 June 1920 to the Stanlee Shipbreaking & Salvage Company, who removed the engines, metal-work and upper decks at Dover. The bare hull was resold to the Slough Trading Company in mid-1922 for breaking up in Germany, but was not towed from Dover until 13 January 1923.
