= HMS Queen (1902) =

Pre-dreadnought battleship of the British Royal Navy

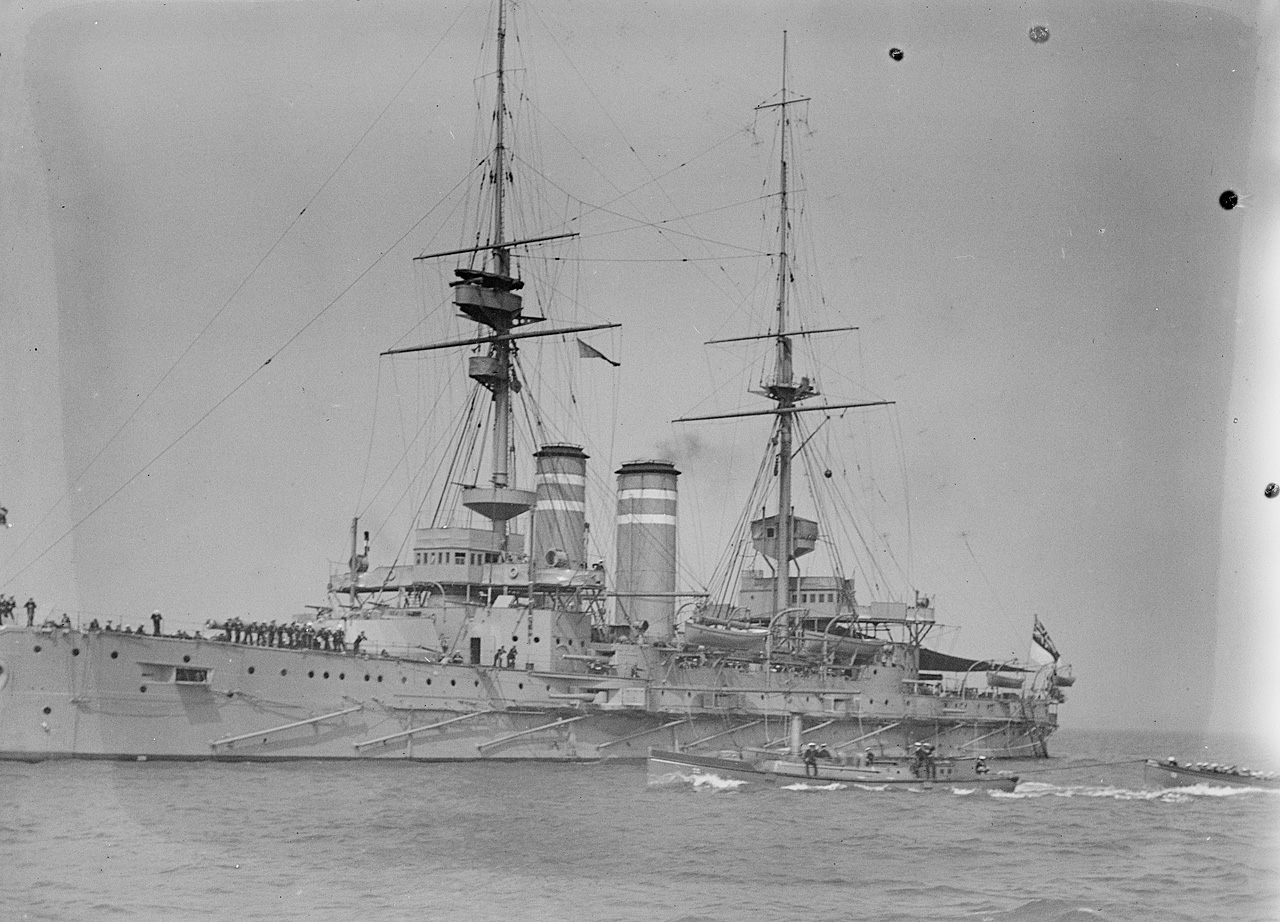
- HMS Queen, c. 1909

History

United Kingdom
- Name: HMS Queen
- Builder: Devonport Dockyard
- Laid down: 12 March 1901
- Launched: 8 March 1902
- Completed: March 1904
- Commissioned: 7 April 1904
- Decommissioned: November 1919
- Fate: Broken up, 1921

General characteristics
- Class & type: London-class battleship
- Displacement: Normal: 14,140 long tons (14,370 t); Full load: 15,400 long tons (15,600 t)
- Length: 431 ft 9 in (131.6 m) o/a
- Beam: 75 ft (22.9 m)
- Draught: 26 ft (7.9 m)
- Installed power: 20 × water-tube boilers; 15,000 ihp (11,000 kW)
- Propulsion: 2 × triple-expansion steam engines; 2 × screw propellers
- Speed: 18 knots (33 km/h; 21 mph)
- Complement: 714
- Armament: 4 × BL 12-inch (305-mm) Mk IX guns; 12 × BL 6 in (152 mm) Mk VII guns; 14 × QF 12-pounder guns; 6 × QF 3-pounder guns; 4 × 18-inch (457-mm) submerged torpedo tubes
- Armour: Belt: 9 in (229 mm); Bulkhead: 9–12 in (229–305 mm); Barbettes: 12 in (305 mm); Turrets: 10 in (254 mm); Casemates: 6 in (152 mm); Conning tower: 14 in (356 mm); Deck: 1–2.5 in (25–64 mm)

HMS Queen was a member of the London class of pre-dreadnought battleships built for the British Royal Navy. The Londons were near repeats of the preceding Formidable-class battleships, but with modified armour protection. Due to slight differences between Queen and HMS Prince of Wales and the other Londons, they are sometimes referred to as the Queen class. The ship's main battery consisted of four 12-inch (305-mm) guns, and she had top speed of 18 knots (33 km/h; 21 mph). The ship was laid down in March 1901, was launched in March 1902, and was completed in March 1904. After commissioning in April 1904, she served with the Mediterranean Fleet until 1906, when she returned to Britain before embarking on another stint with the Mediterranean Fleet later that year. Queen was transferred back to the United Kingdom in 1908 and thereafter served in the Atlantic Fleet, the Home Fleet, and finally the 5th Battle Squadron of the Second Fleet in 1914.

After the outbreak of the First World War in August 1914, Queen, still part of the 5th Battle Squadron, initially served in the English Channel. After operations with the Dover Patrol, she served in the Dardanelles Campaign in support of the Allied landings at Gallipoli. She participated in the Landing at Cape Helles on 25–26 April and supported ANZAC forces ashore over the course of the following month. In late May 1915, Queen was withdrawn to reinforce the Italian fleet at the southern end of the Adriatic Sea after Italy joined the war on the side of the Allies. In early 1917, she was converted into a depot ship to support the Otranto Barrage and was disarmed over the course of the year. The ship returned to Britain after the war in early 1919, where she was briefly used as a barracks ship. Queen was sold for scrap in 1920 and was broken up the following year.

== Design ==
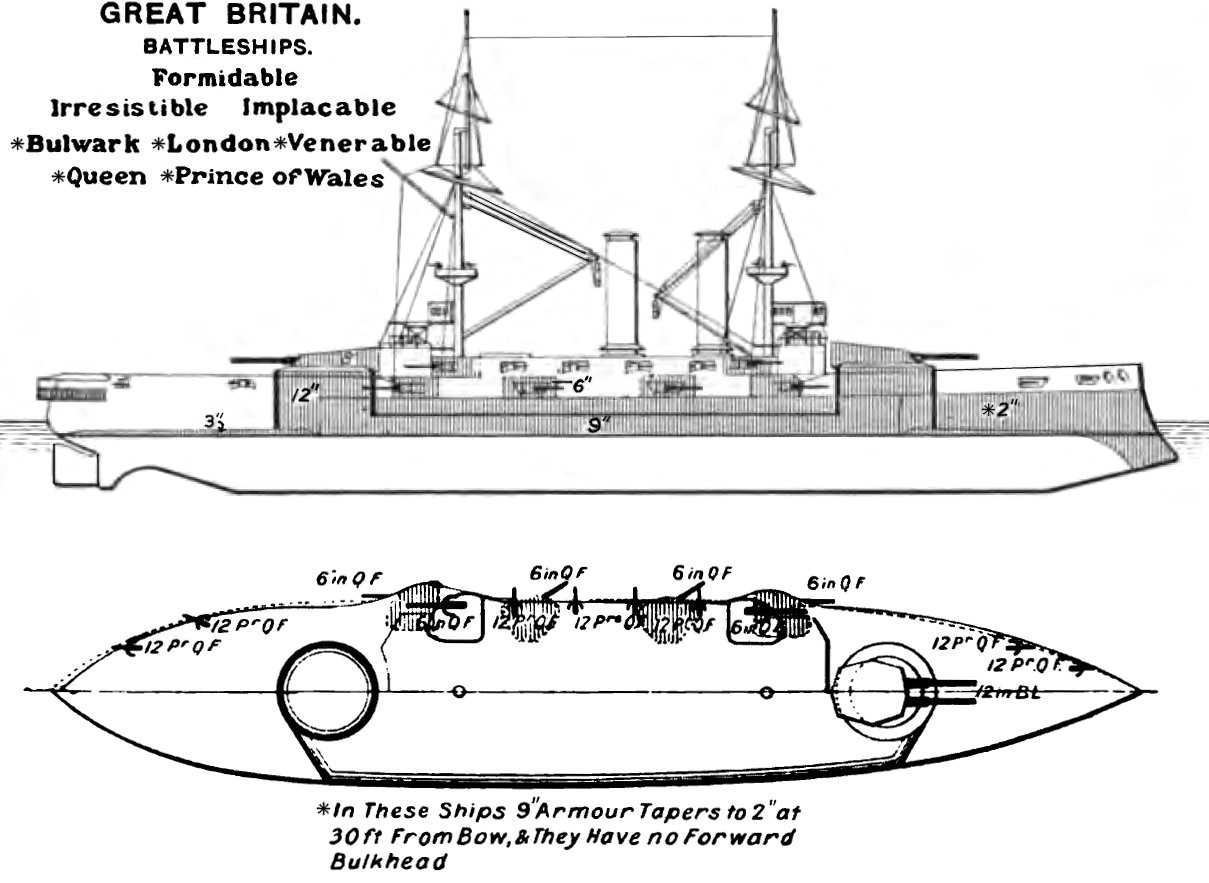
Line-drawing of the Formidable class; the Londons were identical in appearance

The five ships of the London class were ordered in 1898 in response to increased naval construction for the Russian Navy. The design for the London class was prepared in 1898; it was a virtual repeat of the preceding Formidable class, though with significant revision to the forward armour protection scheme. Rather than a traditional transverse bulkhead for the forward end of the main belt armour, the belt was carried further forward and gradually tapered in thickness. Deck armour was also strengthened. Due to slight differences between the last two members of the class—Queen and Prince of Wales—and the rest of the London-class ships, these vessels are sometimes referred to as the Queen class.

Queen was 431 feet 9 inches (131.60 m) long overall, with a beam of 75 ft (23 m) and a draught of 26 ft (7.9 m). She displaced 14,150 long tons (14,380 t) normally and up to 15,400 long tons (15,600 t) fully loaded. Her crew numbered 714 officers and ratings. The Formidable-class ships were powered by a pair of 3-cylinder triple-expansion engines, with steam provided by twenty water-tube boilers. Queen was the only member of the class to be fitted with Babcock & Wilcox boilers instead of the Belleville boilers installed in the other ships. The boilers were trunked into two funnels located amidships. The Formidable-class ships had a top speed of 18 knots (33 km/h; 21 mph) from 15,000 indicated horsepower (11,000 kW).

Queen had a main battery of four 12-inch (305 mm) 40-calibre guns mounted in twin-gun turrets fore and aft; these guns were mounted in circular barbettes that allowed all-around loading or elevation. The ships also mounted a secondary battery of twelve 6-inch (152 mm) 45-calibre guns mounted in casemates, in addition to fourteen 12-pounder guns and six 3-pounder guns for defence against torpedo boats. As was customary for battleships of the period, she was also equipped with four 18-inch (457 mm) torpedo tubes submerged in the hull. The tubes were placed on the broadside, abreast of the main battery barbettes.

Queen had an armoured belt that was 9 inches (229 mm) thick; the transverse bulkheads on the aft end of the belt was 9 to 12 in (229 to 305 mm) thick. Her main battery turrets sides were 8 to 10 in (203 to 254 mm) thick, atop 12 in (305 mm) barbettes, and the casemate battery was protected with 6 in of Krupp steel. Her conning tower had 14 in (356 mm) thick sides as well. She was fitted with two armoured decks, 1 and 2.5 in (25 and 64 mm) thick, respectively.

== Service history ==
=== Pre-First World War ===
HMS Queen was laid down at Devonport Dockyard on 12 March 1901. Lady Charles Scott (wife of Admiral Lord Charles Scott), Lady Ernestine Edgcumbe, Mrs. Jackson (wife of Rear-Admiral T. S. Jackson), and Mrs. Champness (wife of Chief Constructor of Devonport Dockyard H. B. Champness) took part in the ceremony. She was launched and named by Queen Alexandra on 8 March 1902, in the presence of King Edward VII. It was the first major public event attended by the couple since the end of the mourning period after Edward VII's accession the previous year. The ship was completed in March 1904.

HMS Queen was commissioned on 7 April 1904 at Devonport Dockyard for service with the Mediterranean Fleet. She returned to the United Kingdom and paid off in April 1906, then recommissioned on 8 May 1906 to return to the Mediterranean. She refitted at Malta in 1906–1907 for duty as a flagship, and on 20 March 1907 became Fleet Flagship, Vice Admiral. Her second commission for Mediterranean Fleet service ended when she paid off at Devonport on 14 December 1908. On 15 December 1908, Queen recommissioned for service with the Atlantic Fleet. She collided with the Greek merchant steamer SS Dafni at Dover on 1 February 1909, suffering no serious damage, and underwent a refit at Devonport in 1910–1911. On 15 May 1912, Queen transferred to the Second Home Fleet. (Note: Though Conway's All the World's Fighting Ships 1906–1921 reports this transfer to have been to 3rd Battle Squadron, First Fleet.) In April 1914 she became 2nd Flagship, Rear Admiral, in the 5th Battle Squadron, Second Fleet, and was assigned duties as a gunnery training ship at Portsmouth.

=== First World War ===
When the First World War began in August 1914, the 5th Battle Squadron was assigned to the Channel Fleet and based at Portland. Queen and her half-sister Implacable were attached temporarily to the Dover Patrol in late October 1914 to bombard German Army forces along the coast of Belgium in support of Allied forces fighting at the front. The German forces were attacking French positions to the east of Dunkirk, and they were in dire need of heavy artillery support. A flotilla of destroyers and monitors helped to break up the attack before Queen and Implacable arrived. Reports of an imminent German counterattack with armoured cruisers, which ultimately failed to materialize, led the British to send the battleships to guard against it in company with the Harwich Force. When it had become clear that the German fleet posed no threat, Queen and Implacable returned to the Channel Fleet. On 14 November 1914, the 5th Battle Squadron was transferred to Sheerness in case of a possible German invasion attempt, but the squadron returned to Portland on 30 December 1914.

In March 1915, as the British and French fleets waging the Dardanelles campaign were preparing to launch a major attack on 18 March, the overall commander, Admiral Sackville Carden, requested two more battleships of the 5th Squadron, Implacable and Queen, to be transferred to his command in the expectation of losses in the coming operation. The Admiralty ordered the two ships to transfer to the Dardanelles, and they left England on 13 March 1915 and arrived at Lemnos on 23 March 1915. By the time they arrived, the British had lost two battleships in the 18 March attack, prompting the Admiralty to send the last two ships of the 5th Squadron to join the fleet. On her arrival off the Dardanelles, Queen joined 2nd Squadron, where she became the flagship of Rear Admiral Cecil Thursby. Over the course of the next month, the British and French fleet began preparations for the Landing at Cape Helles, the beginning of the land portion of the Gallipoli Campaign. She supported the ANZAC landings at Gaba Tepe on 25 April 1915. Queen arrived off the landing beach at about midnight, along with the battleships London and Prince of Wales; they were tasked with supporting the landing of the 3rd Australian Brigade. Queen covered the right side of the beach. Over the course of the landing, Queen and the other covering ships provided covering fire as the ANZAC troops advanced inland and helped to suppress Ottoman artillery.

Queen, Implacable, London, and Prince of Wales were transferred to the 2nd Detached Squadron, organised to reinforce the Italian Navy in the Adriatic Sea when Italy declared war on Austria-Hungary. She arrived at her new base, Taranto, Italy, on 27 May 1915. From December 1916 to February 1917, Queen was refitted for service as a depot ship for the personnel of the Otranto Barrage that attempted to block German and Austro-Hungarian U-boats from passing through the Strait of Otranto. Most of her crew returned to the United Kingdom, leaving only a care-and-maintenance crew behind, and she was gradually disarmed as her guns were allocated to other duties. Most of her 6-inch (150 mm) guns had been removed by April 1917, and all of her 12-inch (300 mm) guns had been put ashore by October 1917, where they were turned over to the Italian Army for use in repelling attacks by the Austro-Hungarian Army, although the turrets were left aboard. Queen became flagship of British Naval Forces, Taranto, serving as such until February 1918.

=== Postwar career ===
Queen left Taranto and returned to the United Kingdom in April 1919 and was placed on the disposal list at Chatham Dockyard in May 1919. She won a temporary reprieve from the scrapper's torch in June 1919 when she was removed from the list and attached to the Pembroke Establishment to serve as an accommodation ship. Queen was placed on the sale list in March 1920 and sold for scrap on 4 September 1920. She arrived at Birkenhead on 25 November 1920 to be lightened so that she could reach her scrapping berth at Preston, then arrived at Preston to be broken up on 5 August 1921.
