= HMS Prince of Wales (1902) =

Pre-dreadnought battleship of the British Royal Navy

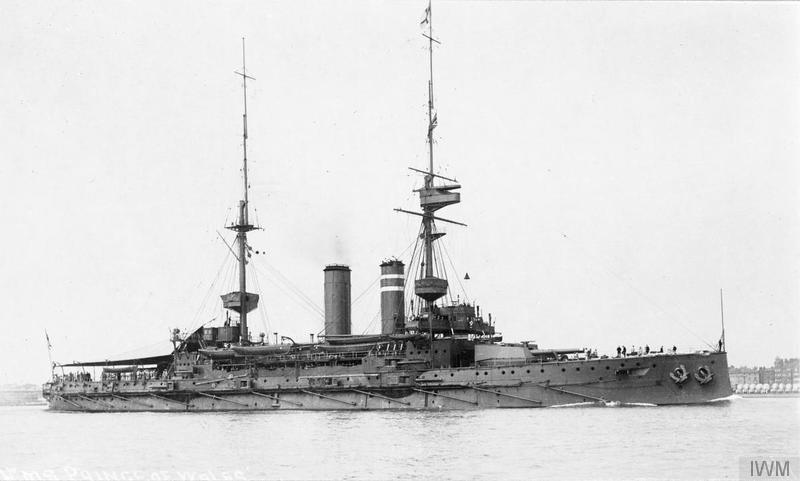
- Prince of Wales underway, 1912

History

United Kingdom
- Name: Prince of Wales
- Namesake: Prince of Wales
- Builder: Chatham Dockyard
- Cost: £1,185,744
- Laid down: 20 March 1901
- Launched: 25 March 1902
- Christened: The Princess of Wales
- Completed: March 1904
- Commissioned: 18 May 1904
- Decommissioned: 10 November 1919
- Fate: Sold for scrap, 12 April 1920

General characteristics
- Class & type: London-class pre-dreadnought battleship
- Displacement: 14,140 long tons (14,370 t)
- Length: 431 ft 9 in (131.6 m) (o/a)
- Beam: 75 ft (22.9 m)
- Draught: 27 ft 3 in (8.3 m) (mean)
- Installed power: 20 Belleville boilers; 15,000 shp (11,000 kW)
- Propulsion: 2 shafts; 2 triple-expansion steam engines
- Speed: 18 knots (33 km/h; 21 mph)
- Range: 5,500 nautical miles (10,200 km; 6,300 mi) at 10 knots (19 km/h; 12 mph)
- Complement: 747
- Armament: 2 × twin 12 in (305 mm) guns; 12 × single 6 in (152 mm) guns; 16 × single 12 pdr (3 in (76 mm)) guns; 6 × single 3-pdr 1.9 in (47 mm) guns; 4 × 18 in (450 mm) torpedo tubes
- Armour: Waterline belt: 9 inches (229 mm); Bulkheads: 9–10 inches (229–254 mm); Barbettes: 6–12 inches (152–305 mm); Gun turrets: 8–10 inches (203–254 mm); Casemates: 6 inches (152 mm); Conning tower: 14 inches (356 mm); Deck: 1–2.5 inches (25–64 mm)

HMS Prince of Wales was a London-class pre-dreadnought battleship built for the Royal Navy in the first decade of the 20th century. She was one of two ships of the London or Queen sub-class. Shortly after completion the ship was assigned to the Mediterranean Fleet and then to the Atlantic in 1909 and Home Fleets three years later. Prince of Wales often served as a flagship during her career.

The ship was assigned to the Channel Fleet after the beginning of the First World War in August 1914 and ferried Royal Marines to Belgium that same month. In early 1915, she was ordered to the Mediterranean to support Allied forces in the Dardanelles Campaign, but remained there only briefly before being ordered to the Adriatic to reinforce Italian forces there in case of an attack by the Austro-Hungarian Navy. She was ordered home in early 1917 and reduced to reserve upon her arrival. She was Paid Off on 5th April 1917. Prince of Wales served as an accommodation ship until she was listed for sale in late 1919, and was sold for scrap in mid-1920 and broken up thereafter.

== Design and description ==
The Director of Naval Construction, Sir William White, proposed a further pair of Londons to round out a tactical squadron of eight ships for the 1900 Naval Programme. After some hesitation, the Admiralty agreed, despite the ongoing construction of the smaller and faster Duncan class. A controversy engendered by Rear-Admiral Lord Charles Beresford, second-in-command of the Mediterranean Fleet, about the retention of obsolete ironclads in the fleet in mid-1900 was largely responsible for the decision. The two ships were virtually identical to the preceding London sub-class of the Formidables and are generally considered part of the Formidable or London class, but the difference in the distribution of their 12-pounder 3-inch (76 mm) guns, their lower displacement, and their later construction than the Duncans lead some authors to view them as constituting a Queen class separate from the Formidable and London classes.

Prince of Wales had an overall length of 431 feet 9 inches (131.6 m), a beam of 75 feet (22.9 m), and a mean draught of 27 feet 3 inches (8.3 m) at deep load. She displaced 14,140 long tons (14,370 t) at normal load and 15,380 long tons (15,630 t) at deep load, some 550 long tons (559 t) lighter than the last of the Londons, HMS Venerable. At deep load the ship had a metacentric height of 4.27 feet (1.30 m). Prince of Wales had a complement of 747 officers and ratings when she was completed in 1904.

The ship was powered by a pair of three-cylinder vertical triple-expansion steam engines, each driving one propeller, using steam provided by 20 Belleville boilers. She was the last British battleship built with Belleville boilers as they had proven problematic and uneconomical in earlier ships. The engines were designed to produce a total of 15,000 indicated horsepower (11,000 kW) give her a speed of 18 knots (33 km/h; 21 mph) and Prince of Wales slightly exceeded this on her sea trials on 8 February 1908, reaching 18.57 knots (34.4 km/h; 21.4 mph). She carried enough coal to steam 5,400 nautical miles (10,000 km; 6,200 mi) at a speed of 10 knots (19 km/h; 12 mph).

=== Armament and armour ===
The London-class ships' main armament consisted of four breech-loading (BL) BL 12-inch (305 mm) Mk IX guns mounted in two twin-gun turrets, one each fore and aft of the superstructure. Each gun was provided with 80 rounds. The guns had a maximum range of 15,150 yards (13,850 m) with their 850-pound (390 kg) shells. Their secondary armament consisted of a dozen BL 6-inch (152 mm) Mk VII guns on single mounts positioned in casemates amidships, six on each broadside. Eight of these were mounted on the main deck and the remainder on the upper deck; the main-deck guns were difficult to work in heavy weather. 200 rounds per gun were carried by the ship. They had a maximum range of approximately 12,200 yards (11,200 m) with their 100-pound (45 kg) shells. Fourteen quick-firing (QF) 12-pounder 3-inch (76 mm) 12-cwt guns were fitted for defence against torpedo boats. Four of these were on the main deck, one pair at each end of the ship and the remaining ten on the upper deck. Prince of Wales also carried six 3-pounder 1.9 in (47 mm) Hotchkiss guns, two in each fighting top and one on each turret roof. The ship was fitted with four submerged 18-inch (450 mm) torpedo tubes, two on each broadside abreast the barbettes.

The Londons' armour scheme was similar to that of the Canopuses, although, unlike in the earlier ships, the waterline armour belt of Krupp cemented armour extended the length of the ship. The 9-inch (229 mm) thick portion was 238 feet (72.5 m) long and ran from just aft of the forward barbette to a point abreast the aft barbette, and had a total height of 15 feet (4.6 m) of which 10 feet 6 inches (3.2 m) was above water and the remainder below water at normal load. The thickness of the forward belt armour reduced in 7–5–3-inch (178–127–76 mm) steps to the 2-inch (51 mm) stem and there was a 1-inch (25 mm) belt running from the aft barbette to the stern. A 9–10-inch (229–254 mm) bulkhead extended obliquely from the aft end of the main belt to the rear face of the aft barbette.

The gun turrets were protected by Krupp armour, 8 inches (203 mm) on their faces and 10 inches on their backs, with roofs 2 to 3 inches thick. The Krupp armour of the barbettes was 12 inches thick above the main deck, but 10 inches on the face and sides and 6 inches on the rear below it. The casemates were protected by 6 inches of Krupp armour. The thicknesses of the mild steel decks ranged from 1 to 2.5 inches (25 to 64 mm). The walls of the forward conning tower were 10 inches of Harvey armour with a 4-inch (102 mm) roof and the aft conning tower had three inches of nickel steel.

== Construction and career ==
Prince of Wales, named after the title conferred upon the eldest son of the monarch, was the fifth ship of her name to serve in the Royal Navy. The ship was laid down at Chatham Dockyard on 20 March 1901, the first keel plate laid by Lady Wharton, wife of Rear-Admiral Sir William Wharton, Hydrographer to the Admiralty. She was launched by the Princess of Wales (later Queen Mary) on 25 March 1902, in the presence of the Prince of Wales (later King George V), for whom the ship was named. Upon completion in March 1904, HMS Prince of Wales immediately went into reserve at Chatham Dockyard. The ship commissioned there on 18 May for service with the Mediterranean Fleet. While in the Mediterranean, she collided with the merchant steamer SS Enidwen off Oran, French North Africa, on 29 July 1905, Enidwen's anchor being pushed through her main deck plating. On 16 April 1906, Prince of Wales had an engine-room explosion in which three men were killed and four injured. On 28 May, she ended her first Mediterranean tour by paying off for a refit at Portsmouth Dockyard that lasted from June to November. On 8 September, the ship again commissioned for Mediterranean Fleet service. She became the flagship of the second-in-command of the fleet in August 1907, and underwent another refit at Malta in 1908.

Prince of Wales transferred to the Atlantic Fleet as flagship of the fleet's commander in February 1909 (Note: Gardiner & Gray and Parkes say that this transfer occurred in November 1908.) and was damaged by an explosion in one of her stokeholds on 2 July. In December 1910, Rear-Admiral John Jellicoe, later commander of the Grand Fleet and First Sea Lord, hoisted his flag in Prince of Wales. The ship underwent a refit at Gibraltar in February–May 1911 before she was transferred to the Home Fleets on 13 May 1912. Initially Prince of Wales became flagship of the 3rd Battle Squadron of the First Fleet, but then reverted to a private ship in the squadron on 13 May. The ship later became the flagship of the second-in-command of the Second Fleet, at Portsmouth. and part of the 5th Battle Squadron. By 18 February 1913, she was serving as the flagship for the second-in-command of the 5th Battle Squadron. On 2 June 1913, she was accidentally rammed by the submarine HMS C32 while participating in exercises, but suffered no damage. By 18 May 1914, Prince of Wales had relieved her sister ship, Queen, as flagship of the 5th Battle Squadron.

=== World War I ===
When World War I broke out in August 1914, the squadron was assigned to the newly reconstituted Channel Fleet on 7 November and based at Portland, from which it patrolled the English Channel. Prince of Wales was now the flagship of Rear-Admiral Bernard Currey and the first task of the squadron was to protect the transfer of the British Expeditionary Force over the English Channel to France. They patrolled the eastern end of the Channel while the 7th and 8th Battle Squadrons covered the cruiser squadron at the western entrance. The Germans made no significant effort to interfere with the traffic in the Channel and the 5th BS was allowed to return to Portland after the bulk of the BEF was across on 23 August. Several days later, the squadron ferried the Portsmouth Marine Battalion to Ostend, Belgium. On 14 November, the squadron transferred to Sheerness to guard against a possible German invasion of the United Kingdom, but it transferred back to Portland on 30 December 1914.

On 19 March 1915, Prince of Wales was ordered to the Dardanelles to participate in the Dardanelles Campaign. She departed Portland on 20 March 1915 and was assigned to the British 5th Squadron of the Allied Fleet off the Dardanelles, where she arrived on 29 March. Prince of Wales supported the landings of the 3rd Brigade, Australian Army, at Gaba Tepe and Anzac Cove on 25 April. Her time at the Dardanelles was destined to be short as the Anglo-French-Italian Naval Convention of 10 May required that the British furnish a squadron of four battleships to reinforce the Italian Navy against the Austro-Hungarian Navy after Italy declared war on Austria-Hungary. Admiral Paolo Thaon di Revel, the Italian naval chief of staff, believed that the threat from Austro-Hungarian submarines and naval mines in the narrow waters of the Adriatic was too serious for him to use the fleet in an active way. He therefore kept his most modern battleships, plus the British ones, at Taranto to blockade the Austro-Hungarians in the Adriatic Sea.

On 22 May, Prince of Wales, along with the battleships Implacable, London, and Queen, was transferred to the Adriatic to form the 2nd Detached Squadron and Prince of Wales arrived at her new base on 27 May. The ship became the flagship of the squadron in March 1916. She ended her flagship duties in June 1916, when she went to Gibraltar for a refit and then returned to the Adriatic.

In February 1917, Prince of Wales was ordered to return to the United Kingdom. On her voyage home, she called at Gibraltar from 28 February 1917 to 10 March 1917 and arrived at Devonport Dockyard later in March. She was placed in reserve on arrival and used as an accommodation ship. Prince of Wales was placed on the disposal list on 10 November 1919, and was sold for scrap to Thos. W. Ward on 12 April 1920. The ship arrived at Milford Haven, Wales, to be broken up in June 1920.
