= London-class battleship =

Pre-dreadnought battleship class of the British Royal Navy

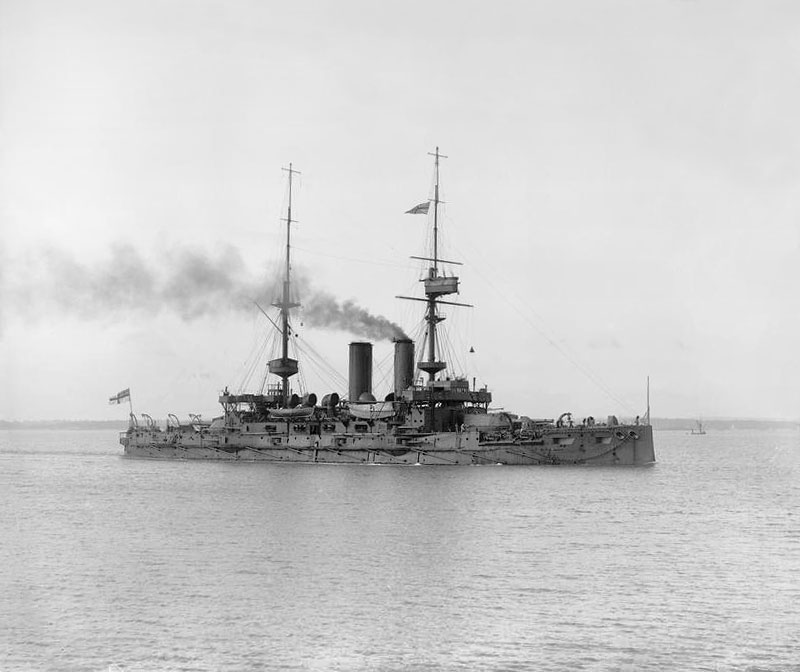
- HMS Bulwark in 1912

Class overview
- Name: London-class battleship
- Builders: Chatham Dockyard (2); Devonport Dockyard (2); Portsmouth Dockyard
- Operators: Royal Navy
- Preceded by: Formidable class
- Succeeded by: Duncan class
- Built: 1898–1904
- In commission: 1902–1919
- Completed: 5
- Lost: 1
- Retired: 4

General characteristics
- Type: Pre-dreadnought battleship
- Displacement: 14,500 long tons (14,733 t) (normal); 15,700 long tons (15,952 t) (full load)
- Length: 431 ft 9 in (131.6 m) o/a
- Beam: 75 ft (22.9 m)
- Draught: 26 ft (7.9 m)
- Installed power: 20 × Water-tube boilers; 15,000 ihp (11,190 kW)
- Propulsion: 2 × Triple-expansion steam engines; 2 × Screw propellers
- Speed: 18 knots (33.3 km/h; 20.7 mph)
- Complement: 714
- Armament: 4 × BL 12-inch (305-mm) Mk IX guns; 12 × BL 6 in (152 mm) Mk VII guns; 16 × QF 12-pounder guns; 6 × QF 3-pounder guns; 4 × 18-inch (457-mm) submerged torpedo tubes
- Armour: Belt: 9 in (23 cm); Bulkhead: 9–12 in (23–30 cm); Barbettes: 12 in (30 cm); Turrets: 10 in (25 cm); Casemates: 6 in (15 cm); Conning tower: 14 in (36 cm); Deck: 1–2.5 in (2.5–6.4 cm)

The London class was a group of five predreadnought battleships built for the British Royal Navy in the late 1890s and early 1900s. The class comprised London, Bulwark, Venerable, Queen, and Prince of Wales. The ships of the London class were very similar to the preceding Formidable class, with the main differences being their armour layout. They were armed with a battery of four 12-inch (305 mm) guns and they had top speed of 18 knots (33 km/h; 21 mph). They are sometimes referred to as being part of the Formidable class due to their similarity, or as being a class of three ships, with the last two forming their own Queen class. The five ships were built between 1898 and 1904 at the Portsmouth, Devonport, and Chatham Dockyards.

All five ships of the class served with the Mediterranean Fleet at the start of their careers; their peacetime years were uneventful, apart from accidental collisions with other ships. Starting in 1907, the Royal Navy began transferring the ships back to home waters, where they served at various times with the Home Fleet, Channel Fleet, and Atlantic Fleet. In 1912–1913, London was used to test the use of ramp-launched airplanes from ships. By 1912, all five members of the class had been transferred to the 5th Battle Squadron, Home Fleet, where they remained through the outbreak of the First World War in July 1914. After Britain's entry into the war in August, the ships escorted the British Expeditionary Force to France. Venerable shelled German troops in October and Bulwark was destroyed in an accidental magazine explosion in November.

Beginning in March 1915, the London-class ships began to be transferred to the Mediterranean Sea to participate in the Dardanelles Campaign; London, Queen, and Prince of Wales supported the Landing at Anzac Cove in April, but they were withdrawn in May to reinforce the Italian fleet blockading the main fleet of the Austro-Hungarian Navy in the Adriatic Sea. At the same time, Venerable was transferred to the Dardanelles, where she supported Allied troops ashore in August before also being sent to the Adriatic at the end of the year. Queen was converted into a depot ship in late 1916 and London and Venerable were withdrawn to Britain, where they were decommissioned and later converted into a minelayer and depot ship, respectively. Prince of Wales became a barracks ship in 1917. All four ships were ultimately sold for scrap in 1920 and broken up between 1920 and 1922.

== Design ==
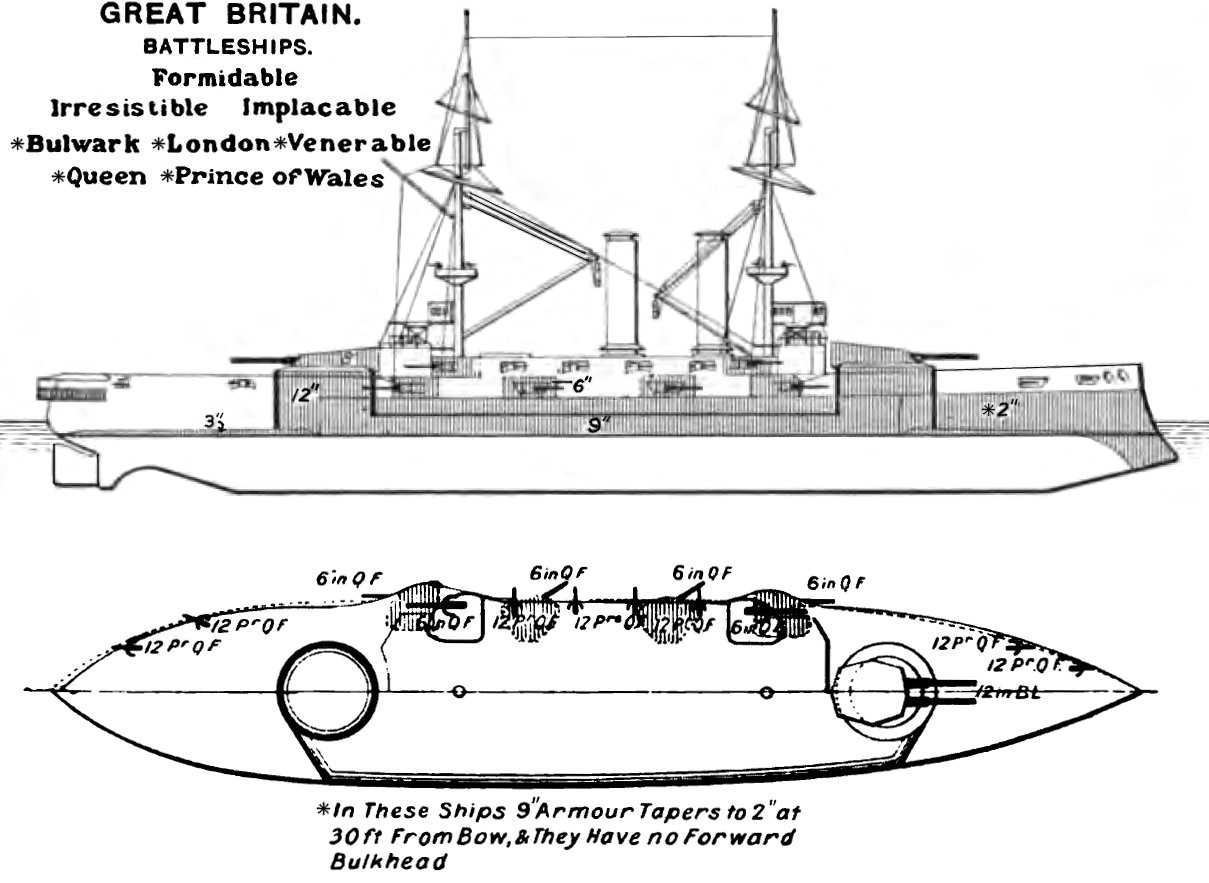
Line-drawing of the Formidable class; the Londons were identical in appearance

For the 1898 construction programme, the Royal Navy decided to build three additional battleships to counter Russian naval building; these became the first members of the London class. These three ships were built to a design closely based on the preceding Formidable class, out of a need to begin construction as quickly as possible in response to the new Russian ships. A new design that was then under development, which would become the Duncan class, could be delayed to allow the design staff to continue their work. Their similarity to the Formidables has led some historians, such as Tony Gibbons, to refer to them as a simple sub-class of the Formidable design, though they are generally referred to as being a distinct class. To add to the confusion, some historians like R. A. Burt refer to the ships as the Bulwark class. The main difference between the Londons and the Formidables was thinner deck armour, a revised side protection arrangement in their bows, and some other detail changes to the armour scheme, and the consequent lower displacement.

Two further London-class ships were built, Prince of Wales and Queen, which were identical to the other Londons except that they had open 12-pounder gun batteries mounted in the open on the upper deck amidships and had a lower displacement. These two ships were ordered to complete a full group of eight comparable ships between the Formidable and London classes. Queen and Prince of Wales were laid down after the Duncan-class battleships that succeeded the Formidables and Londons, and were completed after the Duncans as well. They are generally considered part of the London class, but the difference in the mounting of their 12-pounder guns, their lower displacement, and their later construction than the Duncans lead some authors to view them as constituting a Queen class separate from the Formidable and London classes.

The last of the ships to commission, Prince of Wales, was the last battleship for which Director of Naval Construction Sir William Henry White had sole design responsibility. She also was the last of the twenty-nine battleships of the Majestic, Canopus, Formidable, London, and Duncan classes, commissioned between 1895 and 1904, which had all been based on the single, standard Majestic design and reached their final development in Queen and Prince of Wales.

=== General characteristics and machinery ===
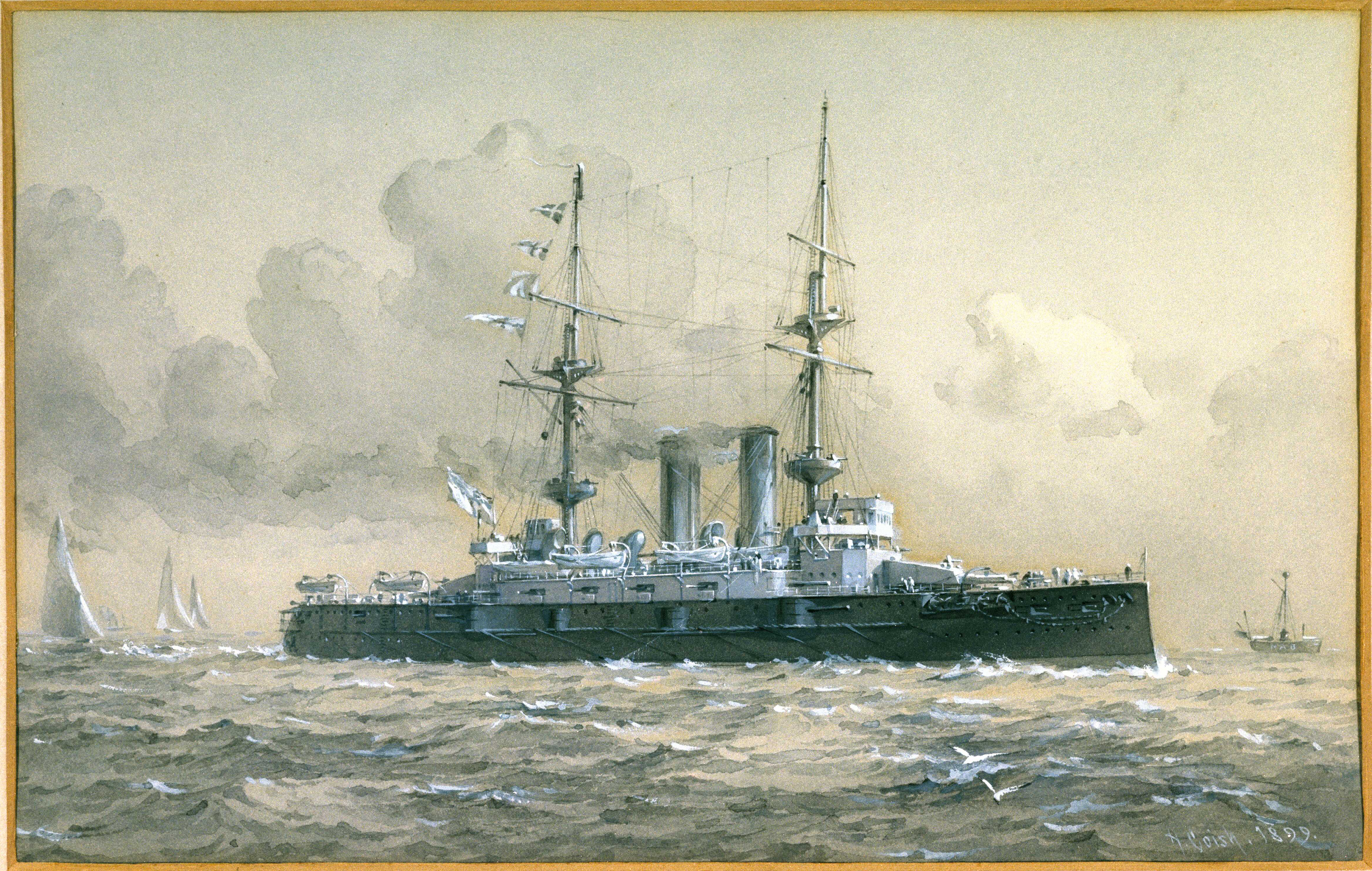
Painting of London in 1899

The ships of the London class were 400 feet (120 m) long between perpendiculars and 431 feet 9 inches (131.60 m) long overall. They had a beam of 75 ft (23 m) and a draft of 26 ft (7.9 m). The first three ships displaced 14,500 long tons (14,733 t) normally and up to 15,700 long tons (15,952 t) fully loaded, while Queen and Prince of Wales displaced 14,150 long tons (14,377 t) and 15,400 long tons (15,647 t), normally and fully loaded respectively. They had two pole masts fitted with fighting tops; each top carried a searchlight, and four additional searchlights were mounted on the forward and aft bridges. The ships' hulls were divided with longitudinal bulkheads that should have allowed for counter-flooding to offset underwater damage, but the equipment necessary to quickly flood a compartment was insufficient, as was typical to many British pre-dreadnought designs.

Their standard crew numbered 714 officers and ratings, though this varied over the course of their careers. During their prewar careers, their total complement ranged from 724 to 768, though while serving as the flagship of the Mediterranean Fleet in 1908, Queen's crew numbered 803, including the command staff; after having been reduced to a depot ship in 1918, Venerable's crew numbered just 361. The ships were fitted with Type 1 wireless telegraphy sets, which were replaced with Type 2 sets in 1909–1910. The ships carried a number of small boats that varied over the course of their careers, including a variety of steam and sail pinnaces, steam launches, cutters, galleys, whalers, three gigs, dinghies, and rafts.

The London-class ships were powered by a pair of 3-cylinder triple-expansion engines that drove two inward-turning screws. Steam for the engines was provided by twenty Belleville boilers, except for Queen, which received thirteen Babcock & Wilcox boilers. Each ship's boilers were divided into three boiler rooms and they were trunked into two funnels located amidships. Negative experiences with the Belleville boilers aboard the Formidable-class ships led to the decision to abandon the type in favour of the Babcock & Wilcox type while Queen and Prince of Wales were still under construction. The new boilers required alteration to the boiler rooms; Prince of Wales was to have received the new boilers, but construction of the ship had proceeded too far by the time the decision was made to replace the Belleville boilers.

The London-class ships had a top speed of 18 knots (33 km/h; 21 mph) from 15,000 indicated horsepower (11,000 kW). On speed trials, all five of the ships slightly exceeded their design horsepower and speed, reaching speeds of 18.04 to 18.4 knots (33.41 to 34.08 km/h; 20.76 to 21.17 mph) from 15,264 to 15,660 ihp (11,382 to 11,678 kW). They carried 900 long tons (910 t) of coal for the boilers, though their maximum capacity was 2,000 long tons (2,000 t); this provided them a cruising radius of 5,550 nautical miles (10,280 km; 6,390 mi) at a speed of 10 knots (19 km/h; 12 mph), though Prince of Wales's boilers were less efficient than those of her sisters, and her cruising range was correspondingly slightly lower, at 5,400 nmi (10,000 km; 6,200 mi).

=== Armament and armour ===
Illustration of London firing a broadside

The ships of the London class had four 12-inch (305 mm) 40-calibre Mark IX guns mounted in twin-gun turrets fore and aft. These guns were placed in BVI mountings in circular barbettes that allowed all-around loading or elevation, with the exception of Venerable, which had BVII mountings instead. Each gun was supplied with 80 shells. Both types of mountings had a range of elevation from -5 degrees to 13.5 degrees. The BVI mounts required the guns to return to 4.5 degrees to be loaded, while the BVII mounts allowed for loading at any angle. The guns had a muzzle velocity of 2,562 to 2,573 feet per second (781 to 784 m/s), and they were capable of penetrating 12 inches of Krupp armour at a range of 4,800 yards (4,400 m). At their maximum elevation, the guns had a range of 15,300 yards (14,000 m).

The ships also carried a secondary battery of twelve 6-inch (152 mm) 45-calibre Mark VII guns mounted in casemates, which received 200 shells per gun. The guns had a muzzle velocity of 2,536 ft/s (773 m/s) These guns could penetrate 6 inches of Krupp armour at 2,500 yards (2,300 m). Maximum elevation was 14 degrees, which allowed the guns to engage targets out to 12,000 yards (11,000 m). For close-range defence against torpedo boats, the first three ships carried sixteen 12-pounder guns in pivot mounts with 300 rounds per gun. Queen and Prince of Wales had fourteen of the guns. All five also had six 3-pounder guns, two 12-pounder field guns, and two machine guns. As was customary for battleships of the period, they were also equipped with four 18-inch (457.2 mm) torpedo tubes submerged in the hull; these were placed on the broadside, two abreast of each barbette.

London and her sister ships were protected with a mix of Krupp armour, Harvey armour, nickel steel, and mild steel. Their armour arrangement was an incremental improvement over the preceding Formidables, incorporating developments that had been made for the Duncans, though with thicker armour than had been intended for the Duncan-class ships. They had an armoured belt that was 9 inches (229 mm) thick in the main portion of the belt; the transverse bulkhead on the aft end of the belt was 9 to 12 in (229 to 305 mm) thick. Unlike previous British battleships, the forward part of the central citadel was not capped with a transverse bulkhead; instead, this was omitted to save weight that was used to extend the belt armour all the way along the side of the ship, albeit at reduced thicknesses. Forward of the barbette, the belt was reduced to 7 in (178 mm), then tapered to 5 in (127 mm), then to 3 in (76 mm), and finally to 2 in (51 mm) at the extreme end of the bow.

Their main battery turrets sides were 8 to 10 in (203 to 254 mm) thick, and unlike earlier battleship classes that had curved turrets, the Londons had flat-faced turrets. The turret roofs were 2 to 3 in (51 to 76 mm) thick. This change was a result of the adoption of Krupp armour, which was easier to manufacture that way than Harvey steel was. The turrets sat atop 12 in (305 mm) barbettes, and the casemate battery was protected with 6 in of Krupp steel; the casemates had 2 inches of steel on their sides and backs. Their ammunition hoists were also protected with 2 inches of armour. The ships' forward conning tower had 10 to 14 in (254 to 356 mm) thick sides as well, while the aft tower had 3-inch-thick sides. The ships were fitted with two armoured decks, 1 and 2.5 in (25 and 64 mm) thick, respectively.

== Ships ==
Construction data
| Name | Builder | Laid down | Launched | Completed |
London sub-group
| London | Portsmouth Dockyard | 8 December 1898 | 21 September 1899 | June 1902 |
| Bulwark | Devonport Dockyard | 20 March 1899 | 18 October 1899 | March 1902 |
| Venerable | Chatham Dockyard | 2 January 1899 | 2 November 1899 | November 1902 |
Queen sub-group
| Queen | Devonport Dockyard | 12 March 1901 | 8 March 1902 | March 1904 |
| Prince of Wales | Chatham Dockyard | 20 March 1901 | 25 March 1902 | March 1904 |

== Service history ==
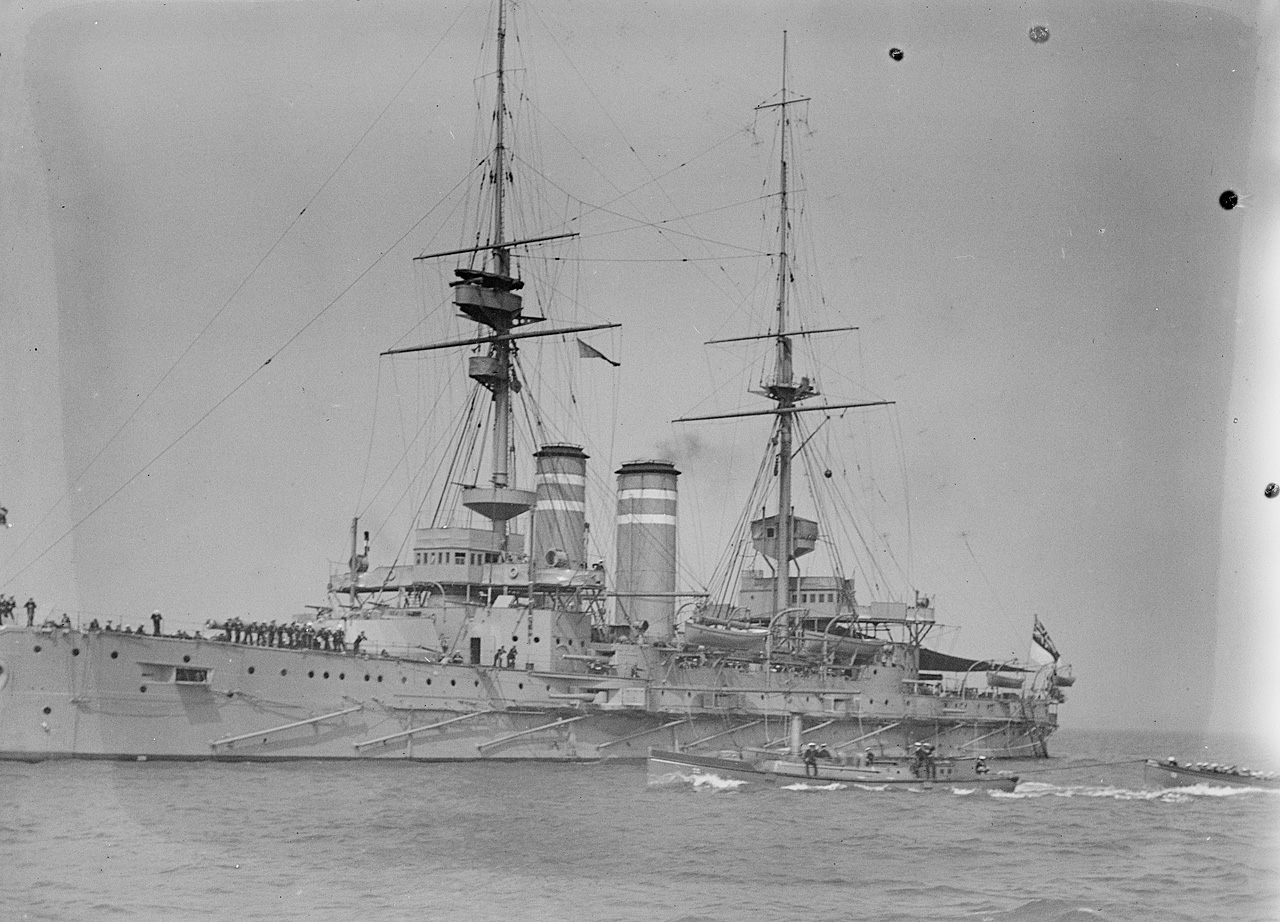
Queen at Spithead in June or July 1909

=== Pre-war careers ===
The ships of the London class had uneventful peacetime careers. London and Queen were involved in collisions with merchant ships in 1912 and 1909, respectively, and Prince of Wales was accidentally rammed by the submarine HMS C32, but none of the battleships were significantly damaged. Throughout their peacetime careers, the ships were repeatedly overhauled and had minor modifications carried out, including alterations to their light armament, addition of searchlights, and installation of improved fire-control and wireless systems. London was used in shipboard aviation experiments in 1912–1913.

From their commissioning, all five ships of the London class served with the Mediterranean Fleet, with London, Bulwark, and Venerable being stationed there in 1902. Queen and Prince of Wales joined them in 1904, though the ships remained there for only a few years before being recalled to Britain between 1907 and 1909. London and Bulwark served with the Home Fleet from 1907 to 1908, at which point they were transferred to the Channel Fleet, where they joined Venerable, which had been recalled from the Mediterranean that year. Queen and Prince of Wales were reassigned to the Atlantic Fleet in 1908 and 1909, respectively; Venerable joined them there in 1909, followed by London in 1910. Bulwark instead transferred back to the 5th Battle Squadron of the Home Fleet in 1909, where she remained until the outbreak of the First World War in 1914. The other members of the class joined her there in 1912. London transferred to the 5th Battle Squadron and was used in experiments with flying off aircraft from May 1912 until 1913, employing a ramp built over her forecastle which had been transferred from the battleship Hibernia.

=== First World War ===
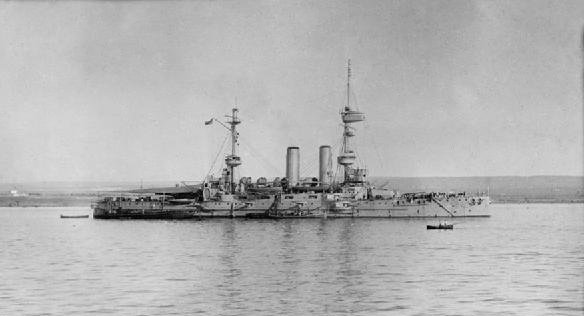
Venerable in Malta in 1915

All five ships were mobilized as part of the 5th Battle Squadron at Britain's entry into the First World War in August 1914. They were initially based in the English Channel, and they helped to escort the British Expeditionary Force across the Channel in August. Venerable was sent to bombard German positions along the coast of Flanders in October, while Queen was temporarily detached to guard against a rumoured German cruiser attack. On 26 November, Bulwark was accidentally destroyed by an internal explosion, probably the result of improper ammunition handling procedures. The four surviving members of the class remained in the Channel, not seeing further action until early 1915, when in early March, Venerable was recalled to the coast of Flanders to shell German positions, which she did through May that year. At the same time, London, Queen, and Prince of Wales were ordered to the Dardanelles, where they were to join the Gallipoli Campaign against the Ottoman Empire.

The three battleships joined the British and French fleet for the landings at Cape Helles and at Anzac Cove, conducted on 25 April. The three ships supported the landing of the 3rd Australian Brigade at Anzac Cove. Over the course of the landing, London, Queen, and Prince of Wales provided covering fire as the ANZAC troops advanced inland and helped to suppress Ottoman artillery. In May, the three ships were reassigned to the 2nd Detached Squadron, which was tasked with supporting the Italian Regia Marina (Royal Navy) in the Adriatic Sea, where it contained the Austro-Hungarian Navy. Admiral Paolo Thaon di Revel, the Italian naval chief of staff, believed that the threat from Austro-Hungarian submarines and naval mines in the narrow waters of the Adriatic was too serious for him to use the fleet in an active way. He therefore kept his most modern battleships, plus the British ones, at Taranto to blockade the Austro-Hungarians. Also in May, Venerable was transferred from the Channel to the Dardanelles; she supported Allied forces ashore in August, before being refit in October and transferred to the 2nd Detached Squadron in December.

In late 1916, Queen was converted into a depot ship to support the Otranto Barrage; she was gradually disarmed over the following year, with the guns being sent ashore to strengthen Italian artillery fighting in northern Italy. Also in late 1916, London and Venerable returned to Britain, where they were decommissioned. In February 1917, Prince of Wales was also recalled to Britain, where she was reduced to a barracks ship. From February to April 1918, London was converted into a minelayer, and she operated in that role for the rest of the war. At the same time, Venerable became a depot ship supporting minelayers in the North Sea.

=== Post-war fates ===
None of the surviving ships remained in service long after the end of the war. Venerable was the first to be decommissioned, in December 1918 immediately after the war. London was reduced to a depot ship in January 1919 and was assigned to the 3rd Fleet. Queen returned to Britain in April 1919, where she was placed for sale in May along with Venerable. Queen and Prince of Wales were sold in 1920 and were broken up the following year in Britain. London remained in service until January 1920 and in March was also placed for sale; she and Venerable were sold in June that year, ultimately being scrapped in Germany in 1922.

The only extant British-built pre-dreadnought remaining today, the Japanese battleship Mikasa was also built to a modified Formidable design, the chief difference being the addition of another pair of 6-inch guns.
