= Formidable-class battleship =

Pre-dreadnought battleship class of the British Royal Navy

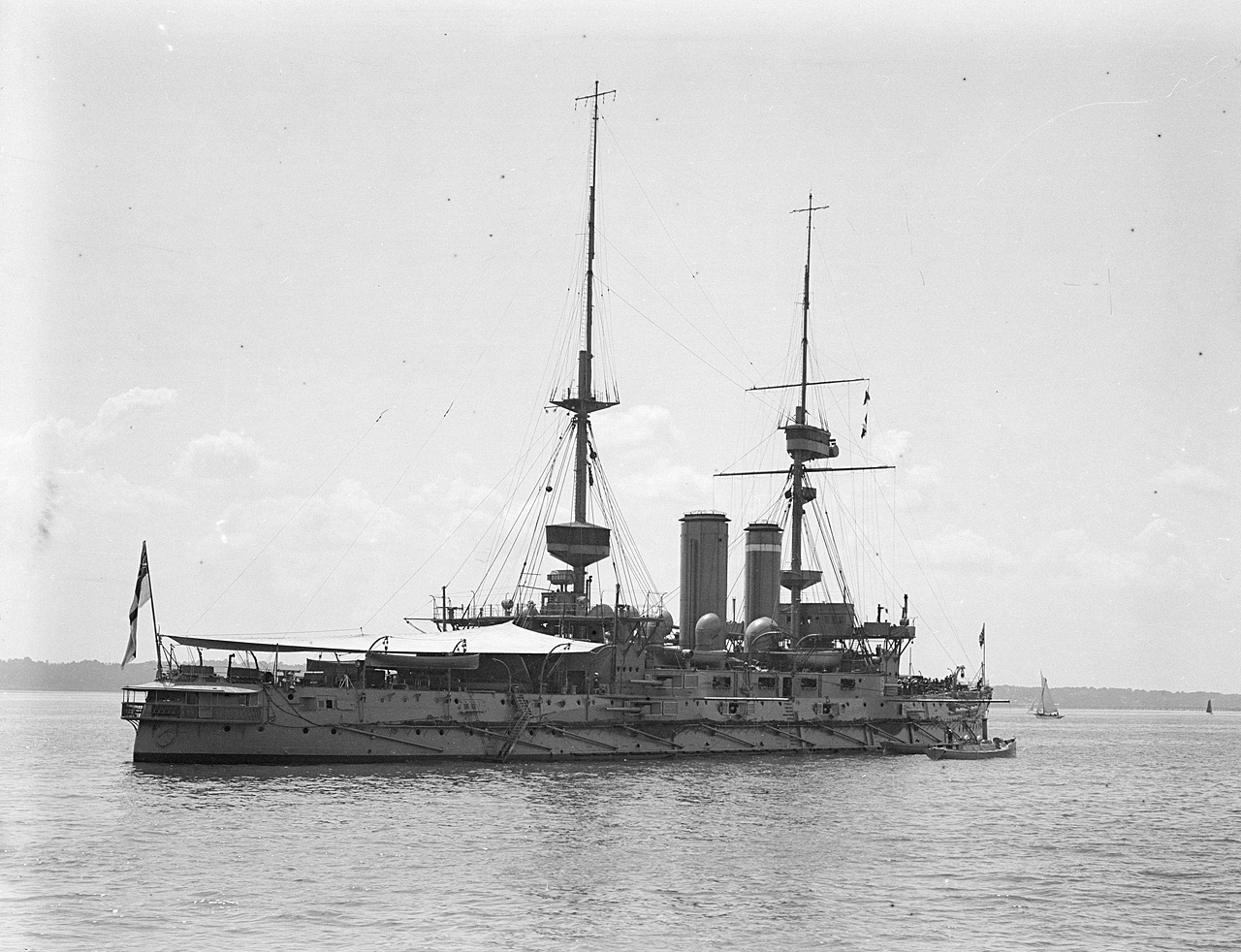
- HMS Implacable at Spithead in 1909.

Class overview
- Name: Formidable-class battleship
- Operators: Royal Navy
- Preceded by: Canopus class
- Succeeded by: London class
- Built: 1898–1901
- In commission: 1901–1919
- Completed: 3
- Lost: 2
- Retired: 1

General characteristics
- Class & type: Pre-dreadnought battleship
- Displacement: Normal: 14,480 to 14,720 long tons (14,710 to 14,960 t); Full load: 15,805 to 15,930 long tons (16,059 to 16,186 t)
- Length: 431 ft 9 in (131.6 m) o/a
- Beam: 75 ft (22.9 m)
- Draught: 26 ft (8 m) (normal); 28 ft 8 in (9 m) (loaded)
- Installed power: 20 × water-tube boilers; 15,000 ihp (11,000 kW)
- Propulsion: 2 × triple-expansion steam engines; 2 × screw propellers
- Speed: 18 knots (33 km/h; 21 mph)
- Range: 5,100 nmi (9,400 km; 5,900 mi) at 10 knots (19 km/h; 12 mph)
- Complement: 788
- Armament: 4 × BL 12-inch (305-mm) Mk IX guns; 12 × BL 6 in (152 mm) Mk VII guns; 16 × QF 12-pounder guns; 6 × QF 3-pounder guns; 4 × 18 in (457 mm) submerged torpedo tubes
- Armour: Belt: 9 in (229 mm); Bulkheads: 9–12 in (229–305 mm); Barbettes: 12 in (305 mm); Turrets: 10 in (254 mm); Casemates: 6 in (152 mm); Conning tower: 14 in (356 mm); Deck: 1–3 in (25–76 mm)

The Formidable class of battleships were a three-ship class of pre-dreadnoughts designed by Sir William White and built for the Royal Navy in the late 1890s. The class comprised Formidable, Irresistible, and Implacable. They were armed with a battery of four 12-inch (305 mm) guns, they had top speed of 18 knots (33 km/h; 21 mph), and they marked the adoption of Krupp armour in British battleship designs. The class formed the basis for the nearly identical London class of five ships, and those ships are sometimes included in the Formidable class. Formidable, Irresistible, and Implacable were built between 1898 and 1901 at the Portsmouth, Chatham, and Devonport Dockyards, respectively.

All three ships served in the Mediterranean Fleet early in their careers, before returning to British waters in the late 1900s for duty in the Home Fleet, Channel Fleet, and the Atlantic Fleet. By 1912, all three ships had been assigned to the 5th Battle Squadron, Home Fleet, where they remained until the outbreak of the First World War in August 1914. They patrolled the English Channel in the early months of the war and escorted troopships carrying elements of the British Expeditionary Force and other British Army units across the Channel to France. On the night of 31 December 1914 – 1 January 1915 while on patrol in the Channel, the 5th Squadron encountered a German U-boat that torpedoed and sank Formidable. Irresistible was sent to the Dardanelles Campaign in February 1915, and after engaging in a series of attacks on the Ottoman coastal fortifications, she struck a naval mine and sank.

Implacable, the sole surviving member of the class, joined the Dardanelles operations in March 1915 and saw action during the landings at Cape Helles in April. She was later withdrawn, first in May 1915 to reinforce the Italian fleet guarding the Adriatic Sea and then to Salonika in November that year. After being recalled to Britain in July 1917, she was converted into a depot ship and used to support the Northern Patrol. After the war, she was sold for scrap in 1921 and was broken up in 1922.

== Design ==
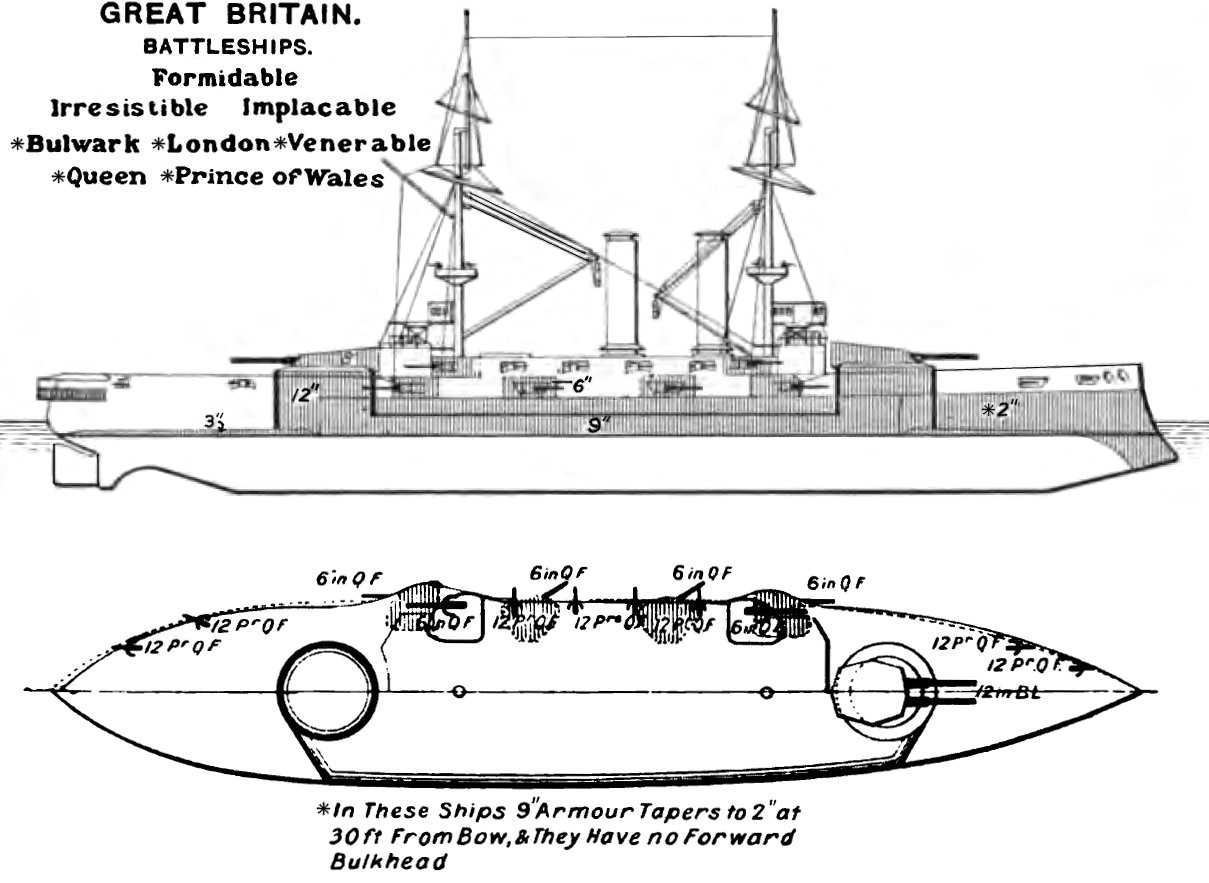
Right elevation and deck plan as depicted in Brassey's Naval Annual 1906

Design work on what became the Formidable class began with a meeting of the Board of Admiralty on 3 May 1897, where the general parameters of the new class was discussed. The Board concluded that repeating the Canopus class would not be a workable solution, since the Imperial Japanese Navy had begun building larger, 15,000-tonne (15,000-long-ton; 17,000-short-ton) battleships and the Canopus design was too small to carry the new 40-calibre 12-inch (305 mm) Mk IX guns, which were significantly heavier than the shorter 35-calibre BL 12-inch Mk VIII guns. The design staff determined that it was possible to construct a new ship that incorporated the advances of the Canopus class—namely, Krupp armour and improved engines and water-tube boilers—on a larger hull like the earlier Majestic-class battleships without increasing displacement and keeping the same speed as the Canopus class.

The Director of Naval Construction, William Henry White, provided two design options, both modified versions of the basic Majestic form. Both variants had a main battery of four 12-inch guns, belt armour that was 8 inches (203 mm) thick, and a top speed of 18 knots (33 km/h; 21 mph). The main difference between the designs was the number of secondary guns; the first had twelve 6 in (152 mm) guns and the second had fourteen of the guns. Displacement differed by just 200 tons, at 14,700 t (14,500 long tons; 16,200 short tons) for the 12-gun variant and 14,900 t (14,700 long tons; 16,400 short tons) for the other one. White preferred the 14-gun version, though the consensus of the Board was that twelve guns were sufficient, on the basis that the two additional guns would overcrowd the upper deck, where they would have been placed, and would have increased the size of the crew too much. Additionally, a secondary battery of twelve guns was deemed to be sufficient in comparison to most other foreign battleships. And while an increase in offensive power would have been welcome, members of the Board decided that the weight savings gained by omitting the two guns could be used to strengthen the ships' armour, which they preferred at a time when naval guns were becoming increasingly powerful.

The board adopted the 12-gun version, along with a request to increase the belt to 9 inches (229 mm). The thicker armour increased displacement to 15,000 t (15,000 long tons). The board requested that White prepare drawings for this new design on 19 June. A model was created by 17 August, which allowed the design staff to refine the hull shape. The staff cut away the deadwood forward and aft, which made the vessels more handy.

Due to their similarity, some like historian Tony Gibbons consider the five London-class battleships to be part of the Formidable class, though most historians view them as a distinct class. The five London-class ships differed from the Formidables in their protection layout, which abandoned the forward armoured bulkhead in favour of an armoured belt that extended all the way to the stem. Regardless, the Formidable design provided the basis for the five Londons that were ordered under the 1898 programme. The only extant British built pre-dreadnought remaining, the Japanese battleship Mikasa was also built to a slightly modified design, the chief difference being the addition of another pair of 6-inch guns.

=== General characteristics and machinery ===
The ships of the Formidable class were 400 feet (122 m) long between perpendiculars, 411 ft (125 m) long at the waterline, and 431 feet 9 inches (132 m) long overall. They had a beam of 75 ft (23 m) and a draft of 26 ft (8 m) normally and 28 ft 8 in (9 m) fully loaded. The three ships displaced between 14,480 to 14,720 long tons (14,710 to 14,960 t) normally and up to 15,805 to 15,930 long tons (16,059 to 16,186 t) fully loaded. Freeboard was 23 ft (7.0 m) forward, 16 ft 9 in (5.11 m) amidships, and 18 ft (5.5 m) aft.

They had two pole masts fitted with fighting tops; each top carried a searchlight, and four additional searchlights were mounted on the forward and aft bridges. Their crew size varied over the course of their careers; Irresistible had a crew of 788 officers and ratings in 1901, and in 1910, Formidable had a crew of 711. After having been withdrawn from active service in 1917, Implacable had a crew of just 361. The ships carried a number of small boats that varied over the course of their careers, including a variety of steam and sail pinnaces, sail launches, cutters, galleys, whalers, three gigs, dinghies, and rafts.

The Formidable-class ships were powered by a pair of 3-cylinder triple-expansion engines that drove two inward-turning screws, with steam provided by twenty Belleville boilers. The boilers were divided into three boiler rooms and were trunked into two funnels located amidships. The boilers proved to be troublesome in service, with all three members of the class experiencing problems with them, particularly as the ships aged, between 1909 and 1914. The Formidable-class ships were rated for a top speed of 18 knots (33 km/h; 21 mph) from 15,000 indicated horsepower (11,000 kW). The ships' normally carried 900 t (890 long tons; 990 short tons) of coal for the boilers, but had a total capacity of 1,920 to 2,000 t (1,890 to 1,970 long tons; 2,120 to 2,200 short tons), which provided a cruising range of 5,100 nmi (9,400 km; 5,900 mi) at a cruising speed of 10 knots (19 km/h; 12 mph).

=== Armament and armour ===
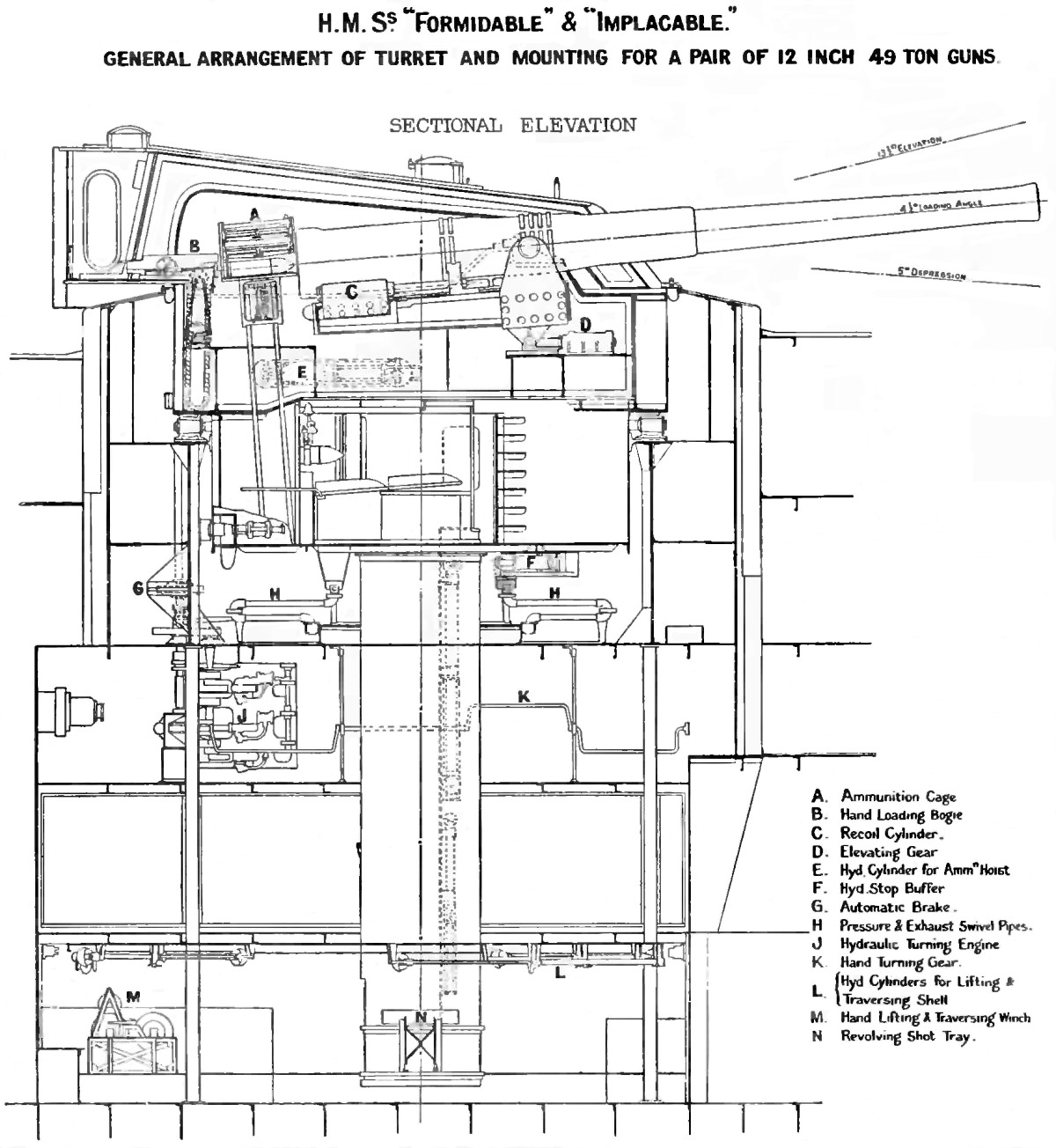
Right elevation of 12 inch gun turret & ammunition hoists

Formidable and her sisters had four 12-inch (305 mm) 40-calibre Mk IX guns mounted in twin-gun turrets fore and aft; these guns were mounted in circular barbettes that allowed all-around loading or elevation. Shell allowance was 80 rounds per gun. The Formidable class were the first to carry these guns, which featured several improvements over the earlier Mk VIII guns used in older battleships, including a stronger barrel design and higher muzzle velocity. Formidable and Implacable had BVI type mountings for their guns, while Irresistible received newer BVII mounts, the primary difference between the two types being the arrangement of the shell hoists and other equipment. Both types of mountings had a range of elevation from -5 degrees to of 13.5 degrees. The BVI mounts required the guns to return to 4.5 degrees to be loaded, while the BVII mounts allowed for loading at any angle. The guns had a muzzle velocity of 2,562 to 2,573 feet per second (781 to 784 m/s), and they were capable of penetrating 12 inches of Krupp armour at a range of 4,800 yards (4,400 m). At their maximum elevation, the guns had a range of 15,300 yards (14,000 m). The guns had a rate of fire of one shot every eighty seconds.

The ships also mounted a secondary battery of twelve 6-inch (152 mm) 45-calibre guns mounted in casemates, which were supplied with 200 rounds per gun. The guns had a muzzle velocity of 2,536 ft/s (773 m/s). These guns could penetrate 6 inches of Krupp armour at 2,500 yards (2,300 m). Maximum elevation was 14 degrees, which allowed the guns to engage targets out to 12,000 yards (11,000 m). For close-range defence against torpedo boats, they carried sixteen 12-pounder guns with 300 rounds per gun and six 3-pounder guns with 500 shells per gun. As was customary for battleships of the period, they were also equipped with four 18-inch (457 mm) torpedo tubes submerged in the hull.

The Formidable-class ships made more extensive use of Krupp steel than the preceding Canopus class, with most of their side armour consisting of the stronger steel. They had an armoured belt that was 9 inches (229 mm) thick and extended from the forward main battery barbette to the aft barbette; the transverse bulkheads on either end of the belt were 9 in thick forward and 9 to 10 in (229 to 254 mm) thick aft. The belt extended from main deck level (9 ft 6 in (3 m) above the waterline) to 5 ft 6 in (2 m) below the waterline. The ships' side plating forward of the belt was 3 in (76 mm) thick, while it was only 1.5 in (38 mm) aft of the belt. The ships were fitted with two armoured decks; the first was a flat deck that was 1 in (25 mm) thick, above the main deck, which was 2 in on the flat portion and increased slightly to 3 in on the sloped sides, where it connected to the belt armour.

The ships' main battery turrets sides and faces were 8 in (203 mm) thick—reduced slightly compared to earlier ships to account for the heavier belt armour—with 10 in (254 mm) thick rears. The turret roofs were 3 in thick. The turrets sat atop 12 in thick barbettes, though Irresistible's barbette armour was reduced in thickness to 10 in behind the belt. Above the main belt was a strake of armour that protected the casemate guns, which was 6 inches thick; behind the casemates, an interior bulkhead that was 2 in (51 mm) thick protected the interior of the ship. Their forward conning tower had 10 to 14 in (254 to 356 mm) thick sides, with a communication tube below the tower that had armour protection that was 8 in (203 mm) thick. The aft conning tower had 3 in thick sides with a 3 in tube below.

== Ships in class ==
Construction data
Name	Builder	Laid down	Launched	Completed
Formidable	Portsmouth Dockyard	21 March 1898	17 November 1898	September 1901
Irresistible	Chatham Dockyard	11 April 1898	15 December 1898	October 1901
Implacable	Devonport Dockyard	13 July 1898	11 March 1899	July 1901

== Service history ==
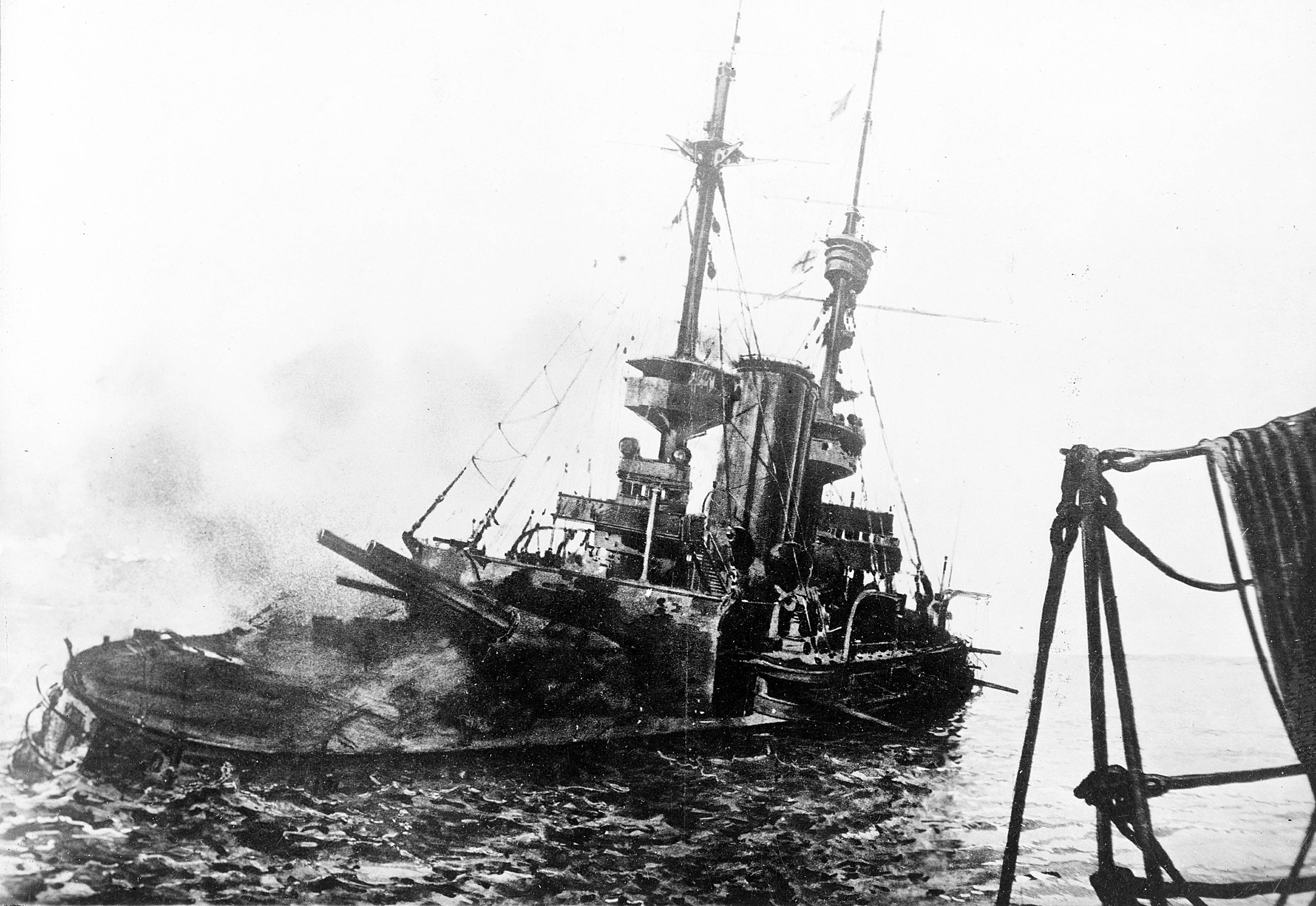
Irresistible listing and sinking in the Dardanelles, 18 March 1915. Photograph taken from the battleship Lord Nelson

The ships of the Formidable class had uneventful peacetime careers. All three ships of the class served with the Mediterranean Fleet as their first station; in 1908, Formidable and Irresistible were recalled to the Channel Fleet, though the former remained there for just a year, transferring to the Home Fleet and then shortly thereafter to the Atlantic Fleet in 1909. That year, Implacable joined her sister ship in the Atlantic Fleet. Between 1911 and 1912, all three ships were assigned to the 5th Battle Squadron of the Home fleet, where they remained for the rest of their peacetime careers. Throughout their peacetime careers, the ships were repeatedly overhauled and had minor modifications carried out, including alterations to their light armament, addition of searchlights, and installation of improved fire-control and wireless systems.

All three ships were mobilized as part of the 5th Battle Squadron at Britain's entry into the First World War in August 1914. They were initially based in the English Channel, and they helped to escort the British Expeditionary Force and later the Portsmouth Marine Battalion across the Channel in August. In October Implacable was temporarily detached to guard against a rumoured German cruiser attack. Shortly after midnight on 1 January 1915, Formidable was torpedoed and sunk by the German U-boat U-24 off Portland Bill while on patrol in the Channel. Most of the ship's crew—35 officers and 512 men—were killed in the sinking. The following month, Irresistible was sent to the eastern Mediterranean Sea to join the Dardanelles Campaign against the Ottoman Empire. She took part in repeated, failed attacks on the Ottoman defences guarding the entrance to the Dardanelles over the course of February and March. During a major Anglo-French attack on the coastal fortifications on 18 March, Irresistible struck a naval mine and sank, though most of her crew was evacuated; around 150 men were killed in her final battle.

Implacable was ordered to join the Dardanelles campaign in March 1915, and she arrived shortly after the loss of Irresistible. She supported the landings at Cape Helles and at Anzac Cove, the beginning of the land portion of the Gallipoli Campaign. On the day of the attack, 25 April, the ship steamed off X Beach at Cape Helles, bombarding Ottoman defences as men went ashore. In recognition of the critical support she had provided the troops as they attacked Ottoman positions, they named the landing site "Implacable Beach". She continued to support the ground forces into May, including during the First and Second Battles of Krithia. In May, she was reassigned to the 2nd Detached Squadron, which was tasked with supporting the Italian Regia Marina (Royal Navy) in the Adriatic Sea, where it contained the Austro-Hungarian Navy. In November, she was again transferred, this time to the 3rd Detached Squadron, based in Salonika, Greece. The ship was recalled to Britain in July 1917, later being converted into a depot ship for the Northern Patrol. Implacable was ultimately sold for scrap in 1921 and was broken up the following year in Germany.
