= 5th Battle Squadron =

Former battleship formation of the Royal Navy

- Active: 1912–1919
- Country: United Kingdom
- Branch: Royal Navy
- Size: Squadron

The 5th Battle Squadron was a squadron of the British Royal Navy consisting of battleships. The 5th Battle Squadron was initially part of the Royal Navy's Second Fleet. During the First World War, the Home Fleet was renamed the Grand Fleet.

== History ==
=== First World War ===
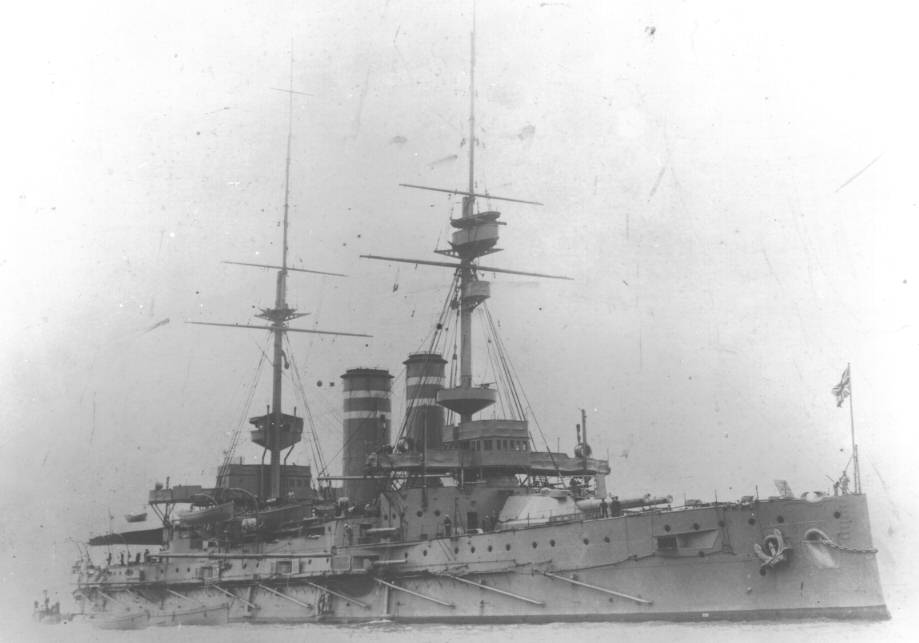
HMS Queen

==== August 1914 ====
In August 1914, the 5th Battle Squadron was based at Portland, and consisted of a number of pre-dreadnought battleships. These were:

- HMS Prince of Wales
- HMS Bulwark
- HMS Implacable
- HMS Irresistible
- HMS Formidable
- HMS London
- HMS Queen
- HMS Venerable

Following the loss of HMS Bulwark in 1914, HMS Lord Nelson and Agamemnon were transferred from the 6th Battle Squadron. With the commissioning of the five fast battleships of the Queen Elizabeth class, the remaining pre-dreadnoughts were sent to the Mediterranean. HMS Queen Elizabeth herself was delayed in joining the squadron, instead taking part in the Dardanelles Campaign until May 1915.

==== Battle of Jutland ====
In 1916, the 5th Battle Squadron—under the command of Rear Admiral Hugh Evan-Thomas— was temporarily transferred to David Beatty's Battlecruiser Fleet. On 31 May, four ships of the Squadron served with distinction in the battle of Jutland. These were:

- HMS Barham Flagship of Rear Admiral H. Evan-Thomas; Captain A. W. Craig;
- HMS Valiant Captain M. Woollcombe;
- HMS Warspite Captain E. M. Philpotts;
- HMS Malaya Captain the Honourable A. D. E. H. Boyle;

In the clash with the German I Scouting Group under Admiral Franz von Hipper, the 5th Battle Squadron "fired with extraordinary rapidity and accuracy" (according to Reinhard Scheer), damaging the battlecruisers SMS Lützow and Seydlitz and a number of other German warships.

Three of the Queen Elizabeths received hits from German warships during the engagement, yet they all returned home, though Warspite—whose steering was jammed—was targeted by the German line, taking 15 hits.

After the battle, HMS Queen Elizabeth—which had missed the battle due to being in dock—rejoined the squadron.

== Vice and Rear-Admirals commanding ==
Post holders as follows:

	Rank	Flag	Name	Term	Notes
Vice/Rear-Admiral, Commanding, 5th Battle Squadron
1	Vice-Admiral	Vice-Admiral - Royal Navy	Sir Cecil Burney	5 December 1913 - 14 August 1914	and as Vice-Admiral Commanding, Channel Fleet
2	Rear-Admiral	Rear-Admiral - Royal Navy	Cecil F. Thursby	14 August 1914 - 20 December 1914	
3	Vice-Admiral	Vice-Admiral - Royal Navy	Sir Lewis Bayly	20 December 1914 - 17 January 1915	and as Vice-Admiral Commanding, Channel Fleet
3	Vice-Admiral	Vice-Admiral - Royal Navy	Sir Alexander Bethell	17 January 1915 - 25 August 1915	and as Vice-Admiral Commanding, Channel Fleet
4	Rear-Admiral	Rear-Admiral - Royal Navy	Sir Hugh Evan-Thomas	25 August 1915 - 1 October 1918	
5	Rear-Admiral	Rear-Admiral - Royal Navy	Sir Arthur Leveson	1 October 1918 - 7 April 1919	

== Second in Command ==
Post holders as follows:

	Rank	Flag	Name	Term	Notes
Rear-Admiral, in the 5th Battle Squadron
1	Rear-Admiral	Rear-Admiral - Royal Navy	Bernard Currey	18 November 1913 - 14 February 1915	
2	Rear-Admiral	Rear-Admiral - Royal Navy	Cecil F. Thursby	29 July, - 14 August 1914	
3	Rear-Admiral	Rear-Admiral - Royal Navy	Lewis Clinton-Baker	1 April 1919 - 7 April 1919	
