= Heino von Heimburg =

German admiral

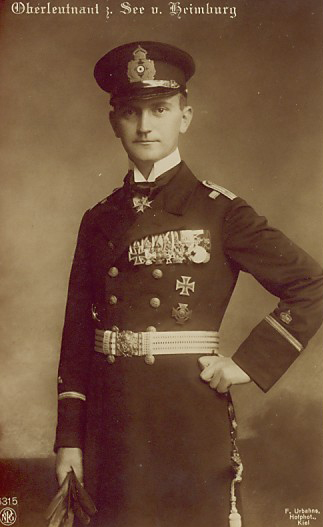
- Oberleutnant z. See v. Heimburg with Pour le Mérite, 1917
- Born: 24 October 1889; Hanover
- Died: 1945 (aged 55–56); Russian SFSR
- Military career
- Allegiance: German Empire; Nazi Germany
- Branch: Imperial German Navy; Kriegsmarine
- Rank: Vizeadmiral (vice admiral)
- Commands: UB-14, 25 March 1915 – 4 December 1915; UB-15, 4 June 1915 – 17 June 1915; UB-14, 6 February 1916 – 31 May 1916; UC-22, 1 July 1916 – 13 July 1917; UB-68, 5 October 1917 – 1 July 1918; U-35, 14 October 1918 – 11 November 1918
- Conflicts: U-boat Campaign (World War I)
- Awards: Knight's Cross with Swords of the Royal House Order of Hohenzollern; Pour le Mérite

Heino von Heimburg (24 October 1889 – October 1945) was a German U-boat commander in the Kaiserliche Marine during World War I and served also as Vizeadmiral (vice admiral) in the Kriegsmarine during World War II.

== World War I ==
On 10 June 1915, Heimburg, in command of UB-15 sank the Italian submarine Medusa off Porto di Piave Vecchia in the northern Adriatic. On 6 July 1915, Heimburg, in command of UB-14 with a crew of 14, torpedoed and sank the Amalfi while operating under the Austrian flag off Venice.

On 16 July, Heimburg sailed for the Dardanelles. This was at a time when the range of submarines was very limited. To reach Bodrum, UB-14 had to be towed a considerable part of the distance by an Austrian destroyer. Even so, her engine broke down off Crete and her compass became defective. Despite these problems, she arrived at Bodrum on 24 July. On arrival, she recharged the batteries of UC-14, which had arrived four days earlier with engine problems. A maintenance team then had to travel from Constantinople to carry out necessary repairs to both submarines. At the time, this journey was not easy, being made partly by train and partly by camel.

On 12 August, Heimburg sailed from Bodrum for the known steamer route between Alexandria and the Dardanelles. His first sighting was of a fully lit hospital ship seen that evening which was not attacked. On 13 August, he first sighted the liner Soudan, in service as a hospital ship.

He then sighted the RMS Royal Edward, sailing unescorted for Madras. He fired one torpedo from under a mile away which hit her stern. Royal Edward sank quickly in position 36°13′N 25°51′E six miles west of Kandeliusa in the Aegean Sea. The after deck was awash in three minutes, and the ship sank by the stern in six minutes. The death toll included 132 crewmembers and perhaps 1000 soldiers, though figures vary. The survivors were picked up by Soudan, two French destroyers and some trawlers. UB-14 did not harass the rescue effort, but headed back to Bodrum with some technical problems, arriving on the morning of the 15 August.

In August, Heimburg damaged the British troopship Southland, bound for Gallipoli. Approximately thirty men were killed, while the remaining troops and crew were rescued by nearby ships. A skeleton crew of volunteers managed to keep the ship afloat and beach it in Moudros harbour.

On 4 September, the British submarine E7 became entangled in enemy torpedo nets off Nagara Point in the Dardanelles. All attempts to free the submarine failed. However, they had caught the attention of Heimburg, currently in harbour with UB-14, which was undergoing repairs at nearby Çanakkale. He visited the spot in a small skiff, from which he lowered a small explosive charge. E7 was forced to the surface. Her crew scuttled her before they were taken as prisoners of war.

On 5 November, Heimburg torpedoed and sank the British submarine E20. After taking command of UC-22, he also torpedoed and sank the French submarine Ariane on 19 June 1917. On 11 August, Heino von Heimburg was awarded the Pour le Mérite.

== Interwar period ==
While interviewing German veterans of the U-boats, American journalist Lowell Thomas was introduced to Heimburg by Lothar von Arnauld de la Perière. Heimburg's interview about his wartime service appeared in Thomas' 1928 book Raiders of the Deep.

== World War II ==
At the beginning of World War II, Heimburg was a judge at the Reichskriegsgericht. Until 1943, when he was retired, Heimburg served in Bremen. In 1944 he was selected to sit on the People's court, a Nazi special court. In March 1945 Heimburg was apprehended by the Soviets and died in a POW camp near Stalingrad in 1945.

== Awards ==
- Iron Cross of 1914, 1st and 2nd class
- Knight's Cross of the Royal House Order of Hohenzollern with Swords
- U-boat War Badge (1918)
- Pour le Mérite (11 August 1917)
- Knight's Cross Second Class of the House and Merit Order of Peter Frederick Louis with Swords (Oldenburg)
- Friedrich August Cross, 1st class (Oldenburg)
- Knight's Cross of the Order of Leopold (Austria)
- Order of the Iron Crown, 3rd class with War Decoration (Austria)
- Silver Imtiyaz Medal with Sword (Ottoman Empire)
- Gold Liakat Medal with Sword (Ottoman Empire)
- Knight's Cross of the Order of Military Merit with Crown (Bulgaria)
