= List of Allied warships that served at Gallipoli =

This is a list of Allied warships that served at the Battle of Gallipoli in 1915.

== Royal Navy warships ==
All British warships which served in the Dardanelles region received the battle honour Dardanelles 1915 after the war

- Seaplane carriers
  - Ark Royal
  - Ben-my-Chree
- Battleships
  - Queen Elizabeth
- Battlecruisers
  - Indefatigable
  - Indomitable
  - Inflexible (mined and damaged on March 18, +40 men killed or drowned)
- Pre-dreadnought battleships
  - Agamemnon
  - Albion (damaged, twice direct hit by shellfire)
  - Canopus
  - Cornwallis
  - Exmouth
  - Glory
  - Goliath (torpedoed and sunk on May 13 at Cape Helles, 570 men killed)
  - Hibernia
  - Implacable
  - Irresistible (mined and sunk on March 18, 150 men killed)
  - London
  - Lord Nelson
  - Magnificent
  - Majestic (torpedoed and sunk on May 27 at Cape Helles, 49 men killed)
  - Mars
  - Ocean (mined and sunk on March 18, little loss of life)
  - Prince George
  - Prince of Wales
  - Queen
  - Russell
  - Swiftsure
  - Triumph (torpedoed and sunk on May 25 at Anzac, 78 men killed)
  - Venerable
  - Vengeance
  - Zealandia
- Cruisers
  - Amethyst (damaged on 14 March 1915, direct hit by shellfire, 26 men killed 34 others wounded)
  - Bacchante
  - Blenheim
  - Chatham
  - Cornwall
  - Dartmouth (damaged on 15 March 1915, boiler explosion, 15 men killed)
  - Doris
  - Dublin (damaged, torpedoed by Austro-Hungarian U-4)
  - Edgar
  - Endymion
  - Europa
  - Euryalus
  - Grafton (damaged on 12 August 1915, direct hit by shellfire, 9 men killed)
  - Kent
  - Minerva
  - Phaeton
  - Sapphire
  - Talbot
  - Theseus
- Destroyers
  - Arno
  - Beagle
  - Bulldog
  - Chelmer (During landing at ANZAC Cove took small arms fire, 1 men killed)
  - Colne
  - Foxhound
  - Grampus (On 17 April 1915 came under small arms fire, several crew including her captain were killed)
  - Grasshopper
  - Hussar
  - Jed
  - Kennet
  - Louis (ran aground during a gale and destroyed by shellfire on October 31)
  - Lydiard
  - Laforey
  - Lawford
  - Mosquito
  - Partridge
  - Pincher
  - Racoon
  - Rattlesnake
  - Renard
  - Ribble
  - Savage
  - Scorpion
  - Scourge
  - Usk
  - Wear
  - Wolverine (damaged on 28 April 1915, direct hit by shellfire, 3 men killed including her captain)
- Monitors
  - Abercrombie
  - Earl of Peterborough
  - Havelock
  - Humber
  - Raglan
  - Roberts
  - Sir Thomas Picton
  - M33
- Sloops
  - Anemone
  - Aster
  - Heliotrope
  - Honeysuckle
  - Jonquil (HQ for British IX Corps at Suvla)
- Submarines
  - B6
  - B11
  - E2
  - E7 (scuttled on September 5)
  - E11
  - E14
  - E15 (destroyed on April 19, 13 men killed)
  - E20 (torpedoed and sunk on November 5, 21 men killed)
- Other
  - HMT Royal Edward (Troopship) torpedoed and sunk by a German U-boat, at least 864 men killed
  - SS Vaderland (1900) (troopship) torpedoed and damaged by a German U-boat, 40 men killed
  - Beryl (Trawler / minesweeper)
  - Canning (Kite balloon ship)
  - Egmont (Ironclad, formerly Achilles)
  - Guildford Castle (Hospital ship)
  - Hector (Kite balloon ship)
  - Heroic (Armed Boarding Steamer)
  - Manica (Kite balloon ship)
  - Triad (Yacht)
  - Barryfield (paddle steamer converted to landing vessel)

== French warships ==
- Battleships
  - Bouvet (mined and sunk on 18 March 1915, 660 men killed)
  - Charlemagne
  - Gaulois (heavily damaged on 18 March 1915)
  - Henri IV
  - Jauréguiberry (damaged)
  - Masséna (hulk scuttled off Cape Helles in November 1915)
  - Saint Louis
  - Suffren (damaged on 18 March 1915, shellfire struck turret, entire crew were killed)
- Cruisers
  - Jeanne d'Arc
  - Latouche-Tréville (damaged, 2 men killed 5 others wounded)
- Submarines
  - Bernoulli
  - Joule (mined and sunk on May 1, 31 men killed)
  - Mariotte (scuttled on July 27)
  - Saphir (sunk on January 15, 1915, 15 men killed)
  - Turquoise (captured on October 30)

== Other warships ==
- Askold - Russian light cruiser
- AE2 - Australian submarine (attacked, later scuttled on April 29, 4 men killed)
