= William Miller (footballer, born 1875) =

Scottish footballer

Personal information
- Full name: William Lee McAllister Miller
- Date of birth: 1875
- Place of birth: Dumfries, Scotland
- Date of death: 13 August 1915 (aged 40)
- Place of death: HMT Royal Edward, Aegean Sea
- Position: Centre forward

Senior career*
Years	Team	Apps	(Gls)
- Dumfries Hibernians
- St Bernard's
1903	Grimsby Town	4	(0)
- * Club domestic league appearances and goals

William Lee McAllister Miller (1875 – 13 August 1915) was a Scottish professional footballer who played in the Football League for Grimsby Town as a centre forward.

== Personal life ==
Miller worked as a picture framer in Dumfries. Miller served as a corporal in the King's Own Scottish Borderers during the First World War and on 13 August 1915 was on board the troopship HMT Royal Edward when it was torpedoed by SM UB-14 in the Aegean Sea. He was initially presumed dead and was later commemorated on the Helles Memorial.
