= Coastal artillery of the Dardanelles Strait =

Coastal artillery of the Dardanelles Strait (Turkish: Çanakkale Tabyaları) are a series of redoubts on each side of the Dardanelles Strait which controlled the strait in the First World War during the Naval operations in the Dardanelles Campaign. Some castles located in the background also supported the coastal artillery.

Side	Name (Turkish)	In British sources	Commissioner and date	Altitude, meter
Anatolian side
Anatolian side	Orhaniye	Orkhaniye No 4	Abdülhamit II (1889)	10
Anatolian side	Karanlık Liman (Kumkale)	No 6	Abdülaziz	25
Anatolian side	Topçamlar		Abdülaziz	75
Anatolian side	Çakaltepe		Abdülaziz	115
Anatolian side	Dardanos	No 8	Abdülhamit II (1892)	50
Anatolian side	Anadolu Hamidiye	Hamidieh No 19	Abdülhamit II (1892)	4
Anatolian side	Çimenlik	Chemenlek No 20	Abdülaziz	30
Anatolian side	Anadolu Mecidiye	Anadolu Medjidieh No 24	Abdülmecit	4
Rumeliaan (Thracean) side
Rumeliaan (Thracean) side	Ertuğrul	No 1	Abdülhamit II (1895)	60
Rumeliaan (Thracean) side	Seddülbahir (castle)	Sedd el Bahr No 3	Turhan Hatice Sultan (1659)	30
Rumeliaan (Thracean) side	Domuztepe		Abdülhamit II (1892)	30
Rumeliaan (Thracean) side	Kayalıktepe		Abdülhamit II	220
Rumeliaan (Thracean) side	Rumeli Mecidiye	No 13	Abdülhamit II (1892)	20
Rumeliaan (Thracean) side	Yıldız	No 9	Abdülhamit II (1892)	225
Rumeliaan (Thracean) side	Rumeli Hamidiye	Hamidieh II No 16	Abdülhamit II (1896)	10
Rumeliaan (Thracean) side	Namazgah	No 17	Abdülaziz	10
Rumeliaan (Thracean) side	Değirmenburnu		Abdülhamit II (1895)	5

== Bouvet ==
The corporal Seyit Çabuk of the Rumeli Mecidiye artillery was responsible in sinking the French battleship Bouvet on 18 April 1915.
