= SM UB-14 =

German Type UB I-class submarine

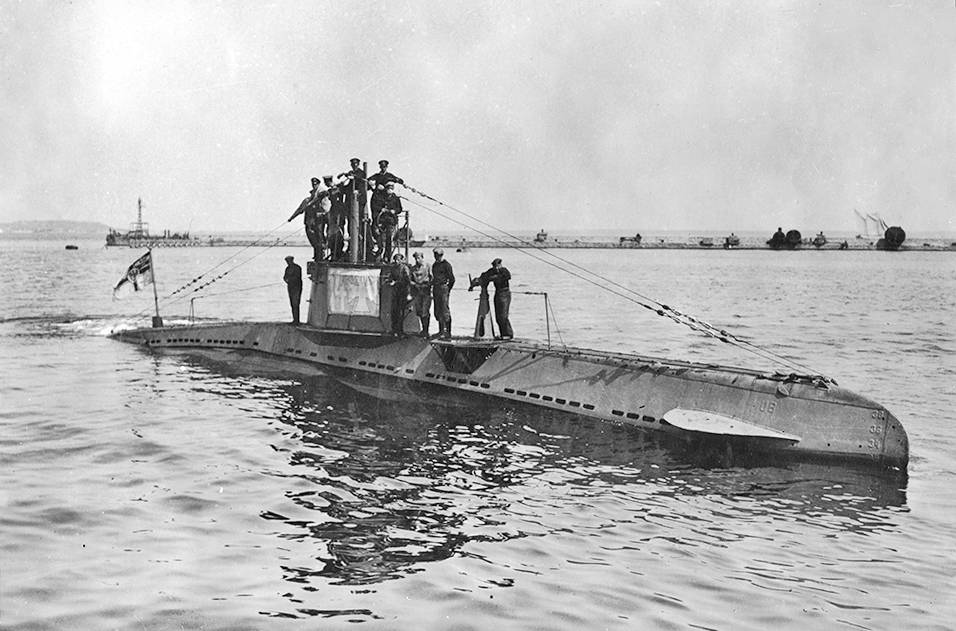
- SM UB-14

History

German Empire
- Name: UB-14
- Ordered: 15 October 1914
- Builder: AG Weser, Bremen
- Yard number: 223
- Laid down: 9 November 1914
- Launched: 23 March 1915
- Commissioned: 25 March 1915
- Fate: Scuttled off Sevastopol in the Black Sea in early 1919

General characteristics
- Class & type: Type UB I submarine
- Displacement: 127 t (125 long tons) surfaced; 141 t (139 long tons) submerged
- Length: 27.88 m (91 ft 6 in) (o/a)
- Beam: 3.15 m (10 ft 4 in)
- Draft: 3.03 m (9 ft 11 in)
- Propulsion: 1 × propeller shaft; 1 × Körting 4-cylinder diesel engine, 59 bhp (44 kW); 1 × Siemens-Schuckert electric motor, 119 shp (89 kW)
- Speed: 7.45 knots (13.80 km/h; 8.57 mph) surfaced; 6.24 knots (11.56 km/h; 7.18 mph) submerged
- Range: 1,500 nmi (2,800 km; 1,700 mi) at 5 knots (9.3 km/h; 5.8 mph); 45 nmi (83 km; 52 mi) at 4 knots (7.4 km/h; 4.6 mph)
- Test depth: 50 metres (160 ft)
- Complement: 14
- Armament: 2 × 45 cm (17.7 in) bow torpedo tubes; 2 × torpedoes; 1 × 8 mm (0.31 in) machine gun
- Notes: 33-second diving time

Service record
- Part of: Pola Flotilla; 1–24 July 1915; Constantinople Flotilla; 24 July 1915 – 11 November 1918
- Commanders: Oblt. Heino von Heimburg; 25 March – 4 December 1915; Oblt. Albrecht von Dewitz; 5 December 1915 – 27 January 1916; 30 January – 5 February 1916; Oblt. Heino von Heimburg; 6 February – 16 June 1916; Oblt. Kurt Schwarz; 17 June – 19 November 1916; Oblt. Ernst Ulrich; 28 May 1917 – 15 March 1918; Oblt. Bodo Elleke; 16 March – 26 November 1918
- Operations: 22 patrols
- Victories: 4 merchant ships sunk (13,610 GRT); 2 warships sunk (10,843 tons); 1 merchant ship damaged (11,899 GRT)

SM UB-14 was a German Type UB I submarine or U-boat in the German Imperial Navy (German: Kaiserliche Marine) during World War I. The submarine was also known by the Austro-Hungarian Navy designation of SM U-26.

UB-14 was ordered in October 1914 and was laid down at the AG Weser shipyard in Bremen in November. UB-14 was a little under 28 metres (92 ft) in length and displaced between 127 and 141 tonnes (125 and 139 long tons), depending on whether surfaced or submerged. She carried two torpedoes for her two bow torpedo tubes and was also armed with a deck-mounted machine gun. UB-14 was broken into sections and shipped by rail to the Austrian port Pola for reassembly. She was launched and commissioned in March 1915 as SM UB-14 in the German Imperial Navy under the command of Oberleutnant zur See Heino von Heimburg. (Note: "SM" stands for "Seiner Majestät" (English: His Majesty's) and combined with the U for Unterseeboot would be translated as His Majesty's Submarine.)

Because Germany and Italy were not yet at war when UB-14 entered service, she was transferred in name only to the Austro-Hungarian Navy. The submarine retained her German captain and crew, and remained under German command as a part of the Kaiserliche Marine's Pola Flotilla. During her first patrol in the Adriatic, UB-14 torpedoed and sank the Amalfi. While traveling to Constantinople (present-day Istanbul) to join the Constantinople Flotilla, UB-14 attacked two British troopships, sinking Royal Edward with heavy loss of life, and seriously damaging Southland. All three of UB-14's first victims were among the largest ships attacked by U-boats during the war.

Although UB-14 sank the British submarine HMS E20 in the Sea of Marmara in November 1915, she spent most of the rest of her career patrolling in the Black Sea. The U-boat had only limited success there, sinking only three ships through the end of the war. After the war ended, the submarine was disarmed at Sevastopol and scuttled off that port in early 1919.

== Design and construction ==
After the German Army's rapid advance along the North Sea coast in the earliest stages of World War I, the German Imperial Navy found itself without suitable submarines that could be operated in the narrow and shallow seas off Flanders. Project 34, a design effort begun in mid-August 1914, produced the Type UB I design: a small submarine that could be shipped by rail to a port of operations and quickly assembled. Constrained by railroad size limitations, the UB I design called for a boat about 28 metres (92 ft) long and displacing about 125 tonnes (123 long tons) with two torpedo tubes. (Note: A further refinement of the design—replacing the torpedo tubes with mine chutes but changing little else—evolved into the Type UC I coastal minelaying submarine. See: Miller, p. 458.)

UB-14 was part of the initial allotment of seven submarines—numbered UB-9 to UB-15—ordered on 15 October from AG Weser of Bremen, just shy of two months after planning for the class began. UB-14 was laid down by Weser in Bremen on 9 November. As built, UB-14 was 27.88 metres (91 ft 6 in) long, 3.15 metres (10 ft 4 in) abeam, and had a draft of 3.03 metres (9 ft 11 in). She had a single 59-brake-horsepower (44 kW) Körting 4-cylinder diesel engine for surface travel, and a single 119-shaft-horsepower (89 kW) Siemens-Schuckert electric motor for underwater travel, both attached to a single propeller shaft. Her top speeds were 7.45 knots (13.80 km/h; 8.57 mph), surfaced, and 6.24 knots (11.56 km/h; 7.18 mph), submerged. At more moderate speeds, she could sail up to 1,500 nautical miles (2,800 km; 1,700 mi) on the surface before refueling, and up to 45 nautical miles (83 km; 52 mi) submerged before recharging her batteries. Like all boats of the class, UB-14 was rated to a diving depth of 50 metres (160 ft), and could completely submerge in 33 seconds.

UB-14 was armed with two 45-centimeter (17.7 in) torpedoes in two bow torpedo tubes. She was also outfitted for a single 8-millimeter (0.31 in) machine gun on deck. UB-14's standard complement consisted of one officer and thirteen enlisted men.

== Launching and commissioning ==
Most of the UB I boats were shipped to their port of operations by rail, where they were assembled, launched, tested, and commissioned. Information on UB-14 suggests that she may not have followed that pattern as closely as most other boats. According to several sources, UB-14 was launched on 23 March 1915, and commissioned into the German Imperial Navy as SM UB-14 on 25 March under the command of Oberleutnant zur See Heino von Heimburg a 25-year-old first-time U-boat commander. (Note: Von Heimburg was in the Navy's April 1907 cadet class with 34 other future U-boat captains, including Werner Fürbringer, Hans Howaldt, Otto Steinbrinck, and Ralph Wenninger. See: Helgason, Guðmundur. "WWI Officer Crews: Crew 4/07". German and Austrian U-boats of World War I - Kaiserliche Marine - Uboat.net.) Those same sources are silent on UB-14's whereabouts at the time, but information on UB-14' later shipment and arrival in the Mediterranean suggest that her initial launch and commissioning may have occurred in Germany.

UB-14 was shipped by rail in June to the main Austrian naval base at Pola, with an arrival date on the 12th. The process of shipping a UB I boat involved breaking the submarine down into what was essentially a knock down kit. Each boat was broken into approximately fifteen pieces and loaded onto eight railway flatcars. German engineers and technicians that accompanied earlier UB I boats to Pola worked under the supervision of Kapitänleutnant Hans Adam, head of the U-boat special command (German: Sonderkommando). Typically, the UB I assembly process took about two to three weeks.

While UB-14 made her way to Austria-Hungary, von Heimburg and his German crew were assigned to UB-15 at Pola. The submarine was temporarily commissioned into the German Imperial Navy before a subsequent transfer to the Austro-Hungarian Navy as its U-11. Von Heimburg and his German crew, with one Austrian officer aboard, gained valuable experience in UB-15/U-11, sinking the Medusa on that U-boat's first patrol. UB-15/U-11 was handed over to the Austro-Hungarian Navy on 16 June, and von Heimburg and his crew were transferred intact on 21 June to UB-14, which was still a few days from completion.

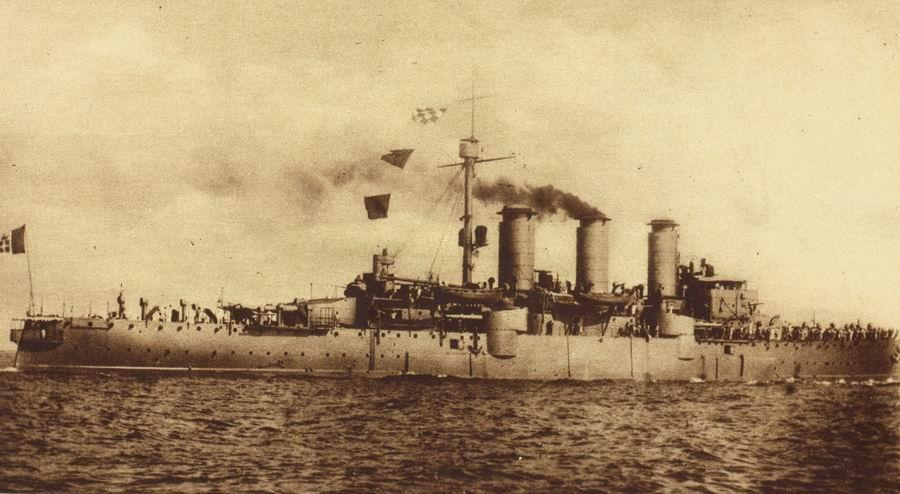
The Amalfi was sunk on UB-14's first patrol.

At the outbreak of World War I in August 1914, Italy had declined to join its Triple Alliance partners—Germany and Austria-Hungary—in declaring war against the Entente Powers, and opted to remain neutral. Pressure from the United Kingdom and France swayed Italy to sign the secret 1915 Treaty of London on 26 April, in which Italy promised to leave the Triple Alliance and declare war against its former allies within a month in return for territorial gains after the end of the war. Because Italy initially declared war only on Austria-Hungary, Germany and Italy were not officially at war. As a consequence, German submarines operating in the Adriatic and the Mediterranean were all assigned Austrian numbers and flew the flag of Austria-Hungary when making attacks on Italian vessels; UB-14 was assigned the designation of U-26 and entered onto the rolls of the Austro-Hungarian Navy, despite the fact that she remained completely under German control. According to historian Lawrence Sondhaus, this dual numbering system reflected the close submarine cooperation between the two countries and still makes it difficult to distinguish between submarines of the two navies.

On 1 July, UB-14 joined the Pola Flotilla (German: Deutsche U-Halbflotille Pola), and departed soon thereafter on her first patrol. On the night of 6/7 July, Italian armored cruisers that had recently been deployed at Venice undertook a "reconnaissance in force" off Pola in an attempt to discourage future Austrian sorties against the Italian coast. When the Italian ships retired in the early morning hours of the 7th, UB-14 was about 20 nautical miles (37 km; 23 mi) off Venice. At dawn, the armored cruiser Amalfi crossed paths with UB-14 and was torpedoed. Amalfi quickly began listing to port and sank within 30 minutes with the loss of 67 men. At 10,118 tonnes (9,958 long tons) displacement, Amalfi was one of the largest ships sunk by U-boats during the war. UB-14 escaped the scene without damage.

== Aegean Sea ==
Royal Edward was sunk by UB-14 on 13 August 1915 with the loss of over 900 men

Enver Pasha and other Turkish leaders had been pleading with their German and Austrian allies to send submarines to the Dardanelles to help attack the British and French fleet pounding Turkish positions. As part of the German response, UB-14 was ordered to Constantinople (present-day Istanbul) to join U-21; sister boats UB-7 and UB-8; and the UC I boats UC-14 and UC-15 in the Constantinople Flotilla (German: U-Boote der Mittelmeer-Division in Konstantinopel). Since her intermediate refueling stop at Bodrum was beyond her limited range, UB-14 departed Pola under tow from an Austrian destroyer on 15 July 1915. UB-14's engine and gyrocompass broke down while off Crete, leaving the boat dead in the water for a time, (Note: The single propeller shaft/engine combo was a known weakness of the UB I design that was rectified in the larger Type UB II. See: Miller, p. 48; Williamson, p. 13.) but temporary repairs by the crew enabled the boat to make Bodrum on the 24th. A repair crew from Constantinople was dispatched—having to travel by train and camel just to reach UB-14—and the ship was ready to resume her journey on 13 August. (Note: Naval historian Paul Halpern (p. 149) reports that UB-14 was involved in a scouting operation with the Austro-Hungarian Navy in the central Adriatic on 28 July. Given that UB-14 needed towing assistance and nine days to make Bodrum, it seems unlikely that the submarine could accomplish a passage back to the Adriatic in four days time.)

Shortly after departing Bodrum, UB-14 had just cleared the Greek island of Kos and was off the nearby island of Kandeloussa when von Heimburg sighted several potential victims. The first ship seen was the British hospital ship Soudan, headed to Alexandria from the Dardanelles. Von Heimburg, seeing the properly identified hospital ship, allowed Soudan to pass unmolested. The next ship was not so lucky, however. It was the unescorted Royal Edward, a Canadian ocean liner pressed into troopship duties. Royal Edward was headed in the opposite direction from Soudan: from Alexandria to the Dardanelles with reinforcements for the British 29th Infantry and a small group with the Royal Army Medical Corps, all of whom were destined for Gallipoli. Von Heimburg launched one of his two torpedoes from about a mile (2 km) away and hit Royal Edward in the stern; the ship sank stern-first in six minutes, with a large loss of life. Soudan and several other ships were able to rescue nearly 700 men, but over 900 died. (Note: According to authors James Wise and Scott Baron (p. 77), Royal Edward's death toll was 935 and was as high as it was, they contend, because Royal Edward had just completed a boat drill and the majority of the men were belowdecks re-stowing their equipment. Other sources report widely varying numbers of casualties, ranging from 132 on the low end (Tennent, pp. 36–37), to as many as 1,386 (Hendrickson, p. 270) or 1,865 (Gilbert, p. 185) on the upper end.) Royal Edward, at 11,117 gross register tons (GRT), was also among the largest ships hit by U-boats during the war. While evading the rescue ships, which included two French destroyers, UB-14's compass broke down again, forcing a return to Bodrum on the morning of the 15th.

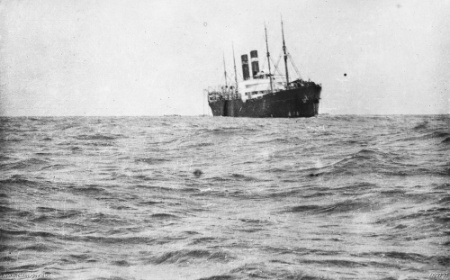
Southland after the torpedo attack by UB-14 on 2 September 1915

After repairs were completed at Bodrum, UB-14 continued on her way with a passenger, Prince Heinrich XXXVII Reuss of Köstritz (of the Reuss Junior Line) who needed passage to Constantinople. During the journey north, UB-14 came upon another fully loaded troopship near the island of Efstratis, about 30 nautical miles (56 km; 35 mi) from Lemnos. At 09:51 on 2 September, von Heimburg launched a single torpedo at the British troopship Southland, which was carrying mostly Australian troops headed for Gallipoli. The torpedo scored a hit on the starboard bow of the liner, which immediately began to list in that direction. As the men boarded lifeboats to abandon ship, another torpedo narrowly missed the stricken ship. The British seaplane carrier Ben-my-Chree sped to the scene of the attack, and rescued nearly 700 men from the water. The hospital ship Neuralia was also on the scene and rescued a sizable number. A group of about 40 volunteers stayed on board Southland to help the crew, and with some towing assistance from Ben-my-Chree, were able to beach the ship on Lemnos. In all, fewer than 40 men died in the attack; among Southland's survivors was James Martin, who, upon his death less than two months later, became the youngest Australian known to have died in the war. The stricken ship had received serious damage, but was later repaired and returned to service. (Note: Southland's return to service was short-lived; she was sunk by U-70 in the North Atlantic in June 1917.) As with UB-14's first two targets, Southland was also the largest ships hit by U-boats, giving von Heimburg and UB-14 three victims from the list of the largest in their first three attacks.

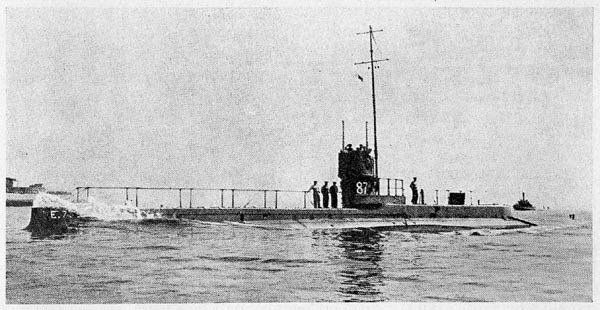
HMS E7 (pictured), which UB-14's commander helped sink in September 1915, was a sister ship of HMS E20, torpedoed by UB-14 in November.

After the attack on Southland, UB-14 broke down again and put in at Chanak to await repairs. While there on 4 September, word came of the British submarine E7 entangled in Turkish antisubmarine nets off Nagara Point. Von Heimburg, Prince Heinrich, and UB-14's cook, a man by the name of Herzig, set out in a rowboat to observe the Turkish attempts to destroy E7. After several mines that formed part of the net had been detonated to no avail, (Note: The type of net in use had electric contact mines that were triggered from the shore. See: Stern: p. 29.) von Heimburg and his group rowed out and repeatedly dropped a plumb line until it contacted metal. Then, von Heimburg dropped a Turkish sinker mine with a shortened fuse right on top of E7. After the hand-dropped mine detonated too close for the British submarine's captain's comfort, he ordered his boat surfaced, abandoned, and scuttled. Between shellfire from the Turkish shore batteries and E7's scuttling charges, von Heimburg and company narrowly escaped harm. While most sources credit E7's sinking to the Turkish efforts, author Robert Stern contends that von Heimburg and UB-14 deserve partial credit for the demise of E7.

== Black Sea ==
After UB-14's repairs were completed, she continued on to Constantinople and, from there, began a patrol in the Black Sea on 3 October. During this patrol, von Heimburg torpedoed the 474 GRT Russian steamer Katja about 15 nautical miles (28 km; 17 mi) northwest of Sevastopol on the 7th, and Apscheron, a Belgian steamer expropriated by the Imperial Russian Navy, 24 nautical miles (44 km; 28 mi) south of Cape Chersonesos on the 8th. After her return to Constantinople on the 19th, UB-14 was prepared for another patrol in the Black Sea. Just before her scheduled departure, however, the U-boat's destination was changed from the Black Sea to the Sea of Marmara and von Heimburg and UB-14 headed south on 5 November. While UB-14 had been in port on 3 November, Turkish forces had captured the Turquoise before the submarine or any of the confidential papers on board could be destroyed. When Turquoise was caught, her commander had not signaled her predicament to anyone, so a scheduled rendezvous with the British submarine HMS E20—as far as anyone other than Turquoise or the Germans and Turks knew—was still on. UB-14 had been sent to keep the rendezvous, reportedly going so far as to radio messages in the latest British code. Upon arriving at the designated location, UB-14 surfaced and fired a torpedo at E20 from a distance of 500 metres (550 yd). Only when E20's crew saw the torpedo did they realize something was amiss, but it was too late to avoid the weapon. The torpedo hit E20's conning tower and sank the submarine with the loss of 21 men. UB-14 rescued nine men, including E20's captain who, reportedly, had been brushing his teeth at the time of the attack.

In December, von Heimburg was replaced as UB-14's commander by Kapitänleutnant Albrecht von Dewitz, but in early February 1916, von Heimburg resumed command. UB-14's activities between November and May are not reported in sources, but Paul Halpern reports that UB-14 patrolled in the Black Sea off Trebizond from late May to early June, returning to Constantinople without success.

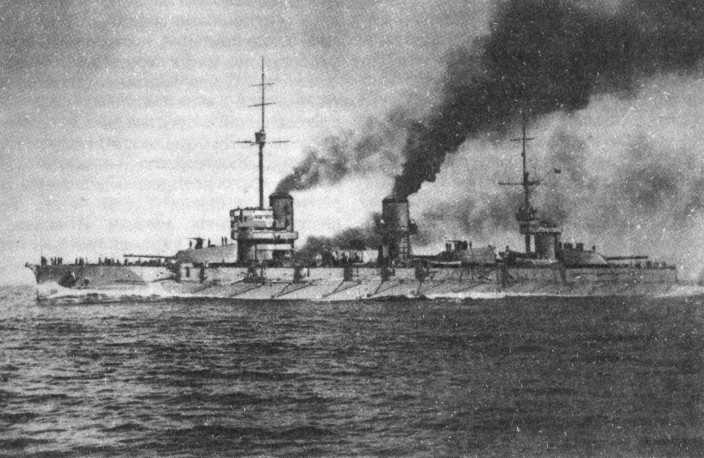
A July 1916 attack by UB-14 on Imperatritsa Mariya was thwarted by her screen of destroyers, which drove the German submarine away.

On 17 June, von Heimburg was recalled to Germany to command the soon-to-be-commissioned UC-22, and was replaced on UB-14 by Kapitänleutnant Kurt Schwarz, a first time U-boat commander. Soon after Schwarz assumed command, UB-14 was in the Black Sea in support of a July sortie by the German battlecruiser Goeben and the light cruiser Breslau in the eastern Black Sea. Because the Russian fleet, headquartered at Sevastopol, might have an opportunity to cut off the German warships on the mission, UB-14 was sent on station off Sevastopol. When the Russian fleet did sortie, Schwarz attempted to torpedo the Imperatritsa Mariya, but was seen and driven off by Russian dreadnought's screen of destroyers.

After Romania joined the war on the side of the Triple Entente in August and was quickly overrun by the Central Powers, the Russian efforts in the Black Sea in the second half of 1916 were focused in the west. Because German submarines never really accomplished all that much in the Black Sea, the February 1917 resumption of unrestricted submarine warfare led the Germans to temporarily abandon the Black Sea in lieu of the more target-rich Mediterranean. UB-14's whereabouts and activities during the latter half of 1916 and the first few months of 1917 are unreported in sources.

On 28 May 1917, Oberleutnant zur See Ernst Ulrich replaced Schwarz, and, soon after, UB-14 sailed on the first German patrol of the year in the Black Sea. On 5 June, UB-14 sank the 155 GRT Russian sailing vessel Karasunda north of Poti; Karasunda was the last ship credited to UB-14. Other than to note that Oberleutnant zur See Bodo Elleke succeeded Ulrich in March 1918, there is no mention in sources of UB-14's activities between June 1917 and November 1918.

After the Russian Soviet Federative Socialist Republic signed the Treaty of Brest-Litovsk with the Central Powers on 3 March 1918, exiting the war, forces of the Central Powers surrounded and later seized the port of Sevastopol. UB-14 was at Sevastopol after Germany signed the armistice treaty that ended all fighting on 11 November. UB-14 and the three other surviving Constantinople Flotilla boats (Note: The other three were UB-42, UC-23, and UC-37. See: Gibson and Prendergast, p. 332, note 1.) were disarmed on 25 November. UB-14 was scuttled in the Black Sea off Sevastopol in the early months of 1919.

== Summary of raiding history ==
Ships sunk or damaged by SM UB-14
Date	Name	Nationality	Tonnage (Note: Merchant ship tonnages are in gross register tons. Military vessels are listed by tons displacement)	Fate
7 July 1915	Amalfi	Regia Marina	10,118	Sunk
13 August 1915	Royal Edward	Canada	11,117	Sunk
2 September 1915	Southland	Royal Navy	11,899	Damaged
7 October 1915	Katja	Russia	474	Sunk
8 October 1915	Apscheron	Russia	1,864	Sunk
6 November 1915	HMS E20	Royal Navy	725	Sunk
5 June 1917	Karasunda	Russia	155	Sunk
		Sunk: Damaged: Total:	24,453; 11,899; 36,352	

== Gallery ==
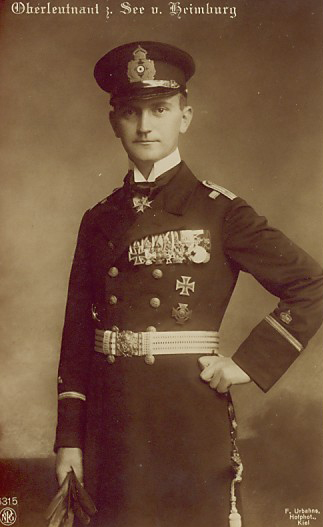
SM UB-14, Commander Oberleutnant zur See Heino von Heimburg with Pour-le-Merit

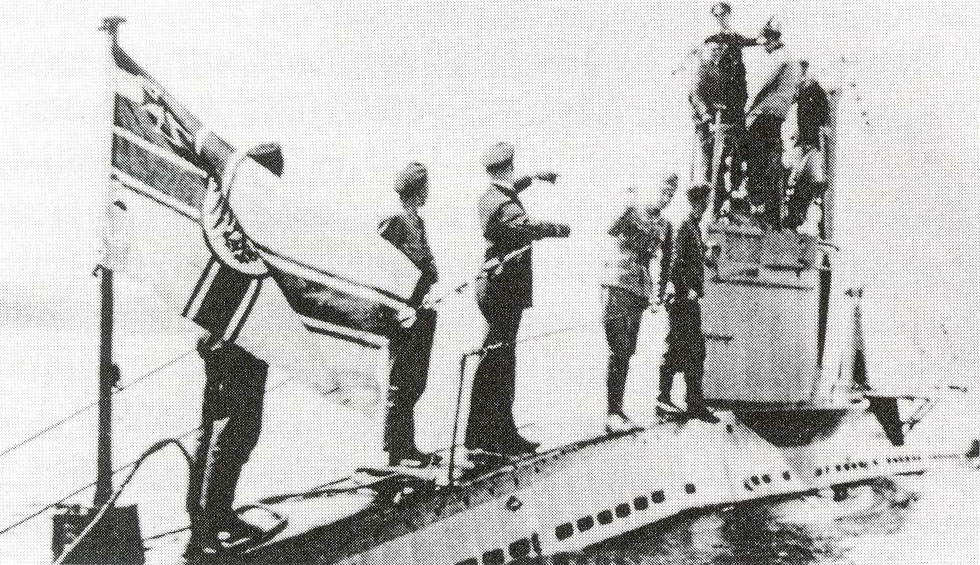
SM UB-14 preparing to leave Pola for Constantinople

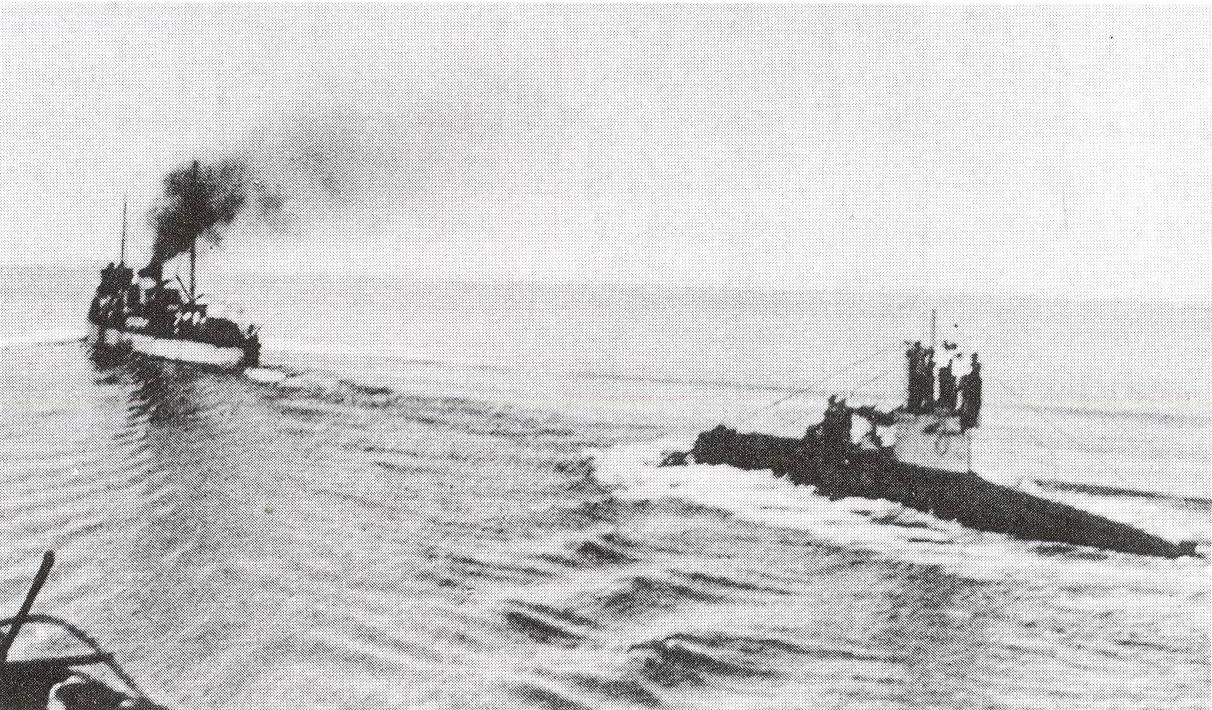
SM UB-14 towed towards Street of Otranto

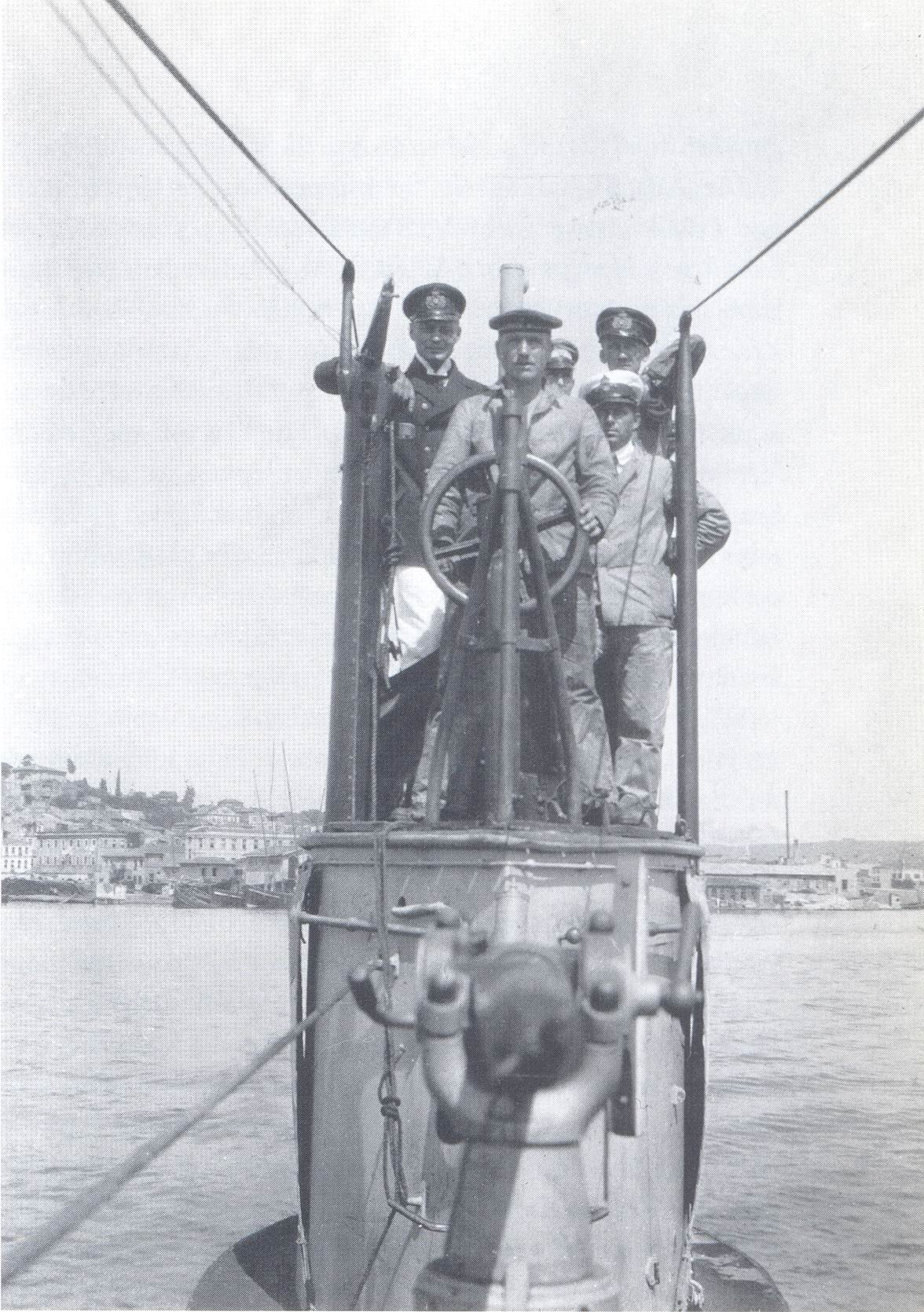
SM UB-14 in Constantinople

== Bibliography ==
- Bendert, Harald (2000). Die UB-Boote der Kaiserlichen Marine, 1914-1918. Einsätze, Erfolge, Schicksal (in German). Hamburg: Verlag E.S. Mittler & Sohn GmbH. ISBN 3-8132-0713-7.
- Gröner, Erich; Jung, Dieter; Maass, Martin (1991). German Warships 1815–1945, U-boats and Mine Warfare Vessels. Vol. 2. Translated by Thomas, Keith; Magowan, Rachel. London: Conway Maritime Press. ISBN 0-85177-593-4.
- Compton-Hall, Richard (2004) [1991]. Submarines at war, 1914–18. Penzance: Periscope Publishing. ISBN 978-1-904381-21-1. OCLC 57639764.
- Gardiner, Robert; Gray, Randal, eds. (1985). Conway's All the World's Fighting Ships 1906–1921. Annapolis, Maryland: Naval Institute Press. ISBN 978-0-87021-907-8. OCLC 12119866.
- Gibson, R. H.; Maurice Prendergast (2003) [1931]. The German Submarine War, 1914–1918. Annapolis, Maryland: Naval Institute Press. ISBN 9781591143147. OCLC 52924732.
- Gilbert, Martin (1996) [1994]. The First World War: A Complete History (1st Owl books ed.). New York: Henry Holt. ISBN 978-0-8050-7617-2. OCLC 34792651.
- Grant, Robert M. (2003). U-boat Hunters: Code Breakers, Divers and the Defeat of the U-boats, 1914–1918. Annapolis, Maryland: Naval Institute Press. ISBN 978-1-59114-889-0. OCLC 54688427.
- Hendrickson, Robert (1984). The Ocean Almanac (1st ed.). Garden City, New York: Doubleday. ISBN 978-0-385-14077-5. OCLC 8532256.
- Karau, Mark D. (2003). Wielding the Dagger: the MarineKorps Flandern and the German War Effort, 1914–1918. Westport, Connecticut: Praeger. ISBN 978-0-313-32475-8. OCLC 51204317.
- Koburger, Charles W. (2001). The Central Powers in the Adriatic, 1914–1918: War in a Narrow Sea. Westport, Connecticut: Praeger. ISBN 978-0-275-97071-0. OCLC 44550580.
- Messimer, Dwight R. (2002). Verschollen: World War I U-boat Losses. Annapolis, Maryland: Naval Institute Press. ISBN 978-1-55750-475-3. OCLC 231973419.
- Miller, David (2002). The Illustrated Directory of Submarines of the World. St. Paul, Minnesota: MBI Pub. Co. ISBN 978-0-7603-1345-9. OCLC 50208951.
- Piper, Leonard (2007). The Tragedy of Erskine Childers. London: Hambledon Continuum. ISBN 978-1-84725-020-9. OCLC 255623189.
- Sondhaus, Lawrence (1994). The Naval Policy of Austria-Hungary, 1867–1918: Navalism, Industrial Development, and the Politics of Dualism. West Lafayette, Indiana: Purdue University Press. ISBN 978-1-55753-034-9. OCLC 59919233.
- Stern, Robert Cecil (2007). The Hunter Hunted: Submarine Versus Submarine: Encounters from World War I to the Present. Annapolis, Maryland: Naval Institute Press. ISBN 978-1-59114-379-6. OCLC 123127537.
- Tarrant, V. E. (1989). The U-Boat Offensive: 1914–1945. Annapolis, Maryland: Naval Institute Press. ISBN 978-0-87021-764-7. OCLC 20338385.
- Tennent, A. J. (2006) [1990]. British Merchant Ships Sunk by U boats in the 1914–1918 War. Penzance: Periscope Publishing. ISBN 1-904381-36-7.
- Williamson, Gordon (2002). U-boats of the Kaiser's Navy. Oxford: Osprey. ISBN 978-1-84176-362-0. OCLC 48627495.
- Wise, James E.; Baron, Scott (2004). Soldiers Lost at Sea: A Chronicle of Troopship Disasters. Annapolis, Maryland: Naval Institute Press. ISBN 978-1-59114-966-8. OCLC 52182511.
