= HMS E20 =

Submarine of the Royal Navy

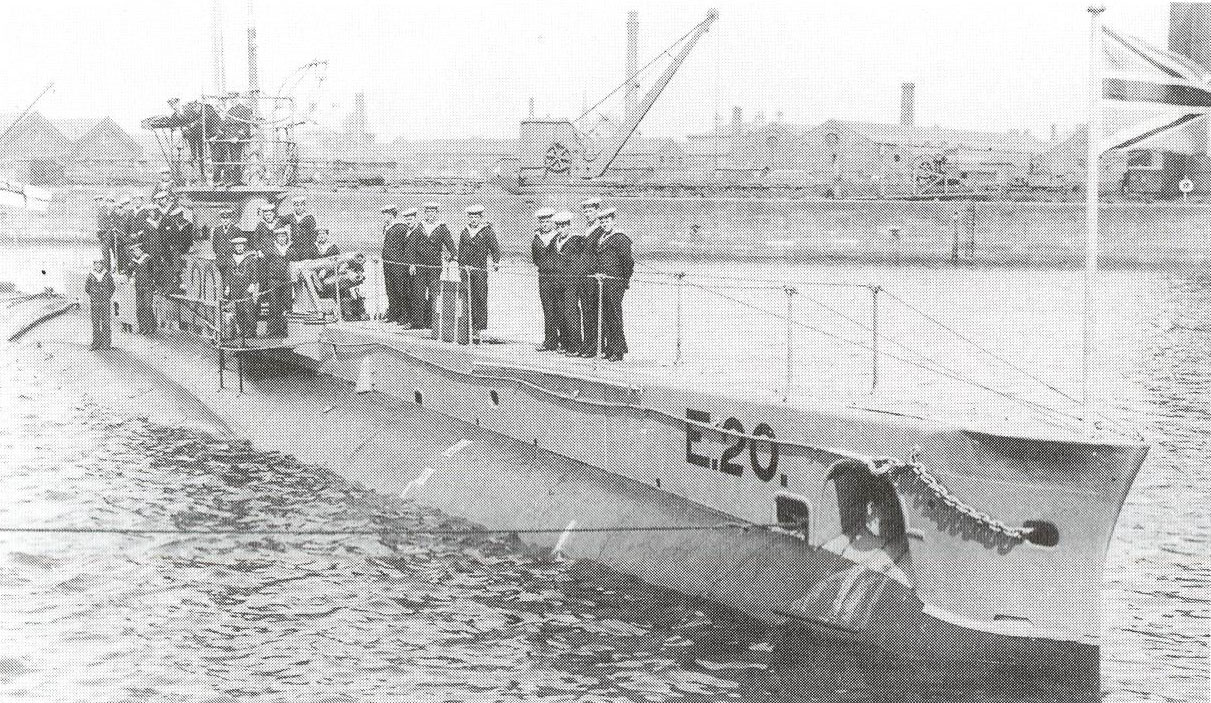
- HMS E20 in harbour

History

United Kingdom
- Name: E20
- Builder: Vickers, Barrow
- Laid down: 25 November 1914
- Launched: 12 June 1915
- Commissioned: 30 August 1915
- Fate: Sunk 6 November 1915

General characteristics
- Class & type: E-class submarine
- Displacement: 662 long tons (673 t) surfaced; 807 long tons (820 t) submerged
- Length: 181 ft (55 m)
- Beam: 15 ft (4.6 m)
- Propulsion: 2 × 800 hp (597 kW) diesels; 2 × 420 hp (313 kW) electric; 2 screws
- Speed: 15.25 knots (28.24 km/h; 17.55 mph) surfaced; 10.25 knots (18.98 km/h; 11.80 mph) submerged
- Range: 3,000 nmi (5,600 km) at 10 kn (19 km/h; 12 mph) surfaced; 65 nmi (120 km) at 5 kn (9.3 km/h; 5.8 mph) submerged
- Complement: 3 officers, 28 men
- Armament: 5 × 18-inch (450 mm) torpedo tubes (2 bow, 2 beam, 1 stern); 1 × 6 in (152 mm) howitzer

HMS E20 was a British E-class submarine built by Vickers, Barrow-in-Furness. She was laid down on 25 November 1914 and was commissioned on 30 August 1915. She was sunk, torpedoed by UB-14, on 6 November 1915.

== Design ==
Like all post-E8 British E-class submarines, E20 had a displacement of 662 long tons (673 t) at the surface and 807 long tons (820 t) while submerged. She had a total length of 180 feet (55 m) and a beam of 22 feet 8.5 inches (6.922 m). She was powered by two 800 horsepower (600 kW) Vickers eight-cylinder two-stroke diesel engines and two 420 horsepower (310 kW) electric motors. The submarine had a maximum surface speed of 16 knots (30 km/h; 18 mph) and a submerged speed of 10 knots (19 km/h; 12 mph). British E-class submarines had fuel capacities of 50 long tons (51 t) of diesel and ranges of 3,255 miles (5,238 km; 2,829 nmi) when travelling at 10 knots (19 km/h; 12 mph). E20 was capable of operating submerged for five hours when travelling at 5 knots (9.3 km/h; 5.8 mph).

E20 was fitted, possibly uniquely within her class, with a 6-inch howitzer deck gun, forward of the conning tower. She had five 18-inch (450 mm) torpedo tubes, two in the bow, one either side amidships, and one in the stern; a total of 10 torpedoes were carried.

E-class submarines had wireless systems with 1 kilowatt (1.3 hp) power ratings; in some submarines, these were later upgraded to 3 kilowatts (4.0 hp) systems by removing a midship torpedo tube. Their maximum design depth was 100 feet (30 m) although in service some reached depths of below 200 feet (61 m). Some submarines contained Fessenden oscillator systems.

== Crew ==
Her complement was three officers and 28 men.

== Loss ==
Operating in the eastern Mediterranean, E20 was scheduled to rendez-vous with the French submarine Turquoise on 6 November 1915. However, on 30 October, Turkish forces sank the Turquoise off Nagara Point in the Dardanelles, refloating her shortly afterwards, her confidential papers retrieved intact. Unaware of her plight, E20 attempted to keep the rendez-vous. The Imperial German Navy submarine UB-14, which was at Constantinople, was duly sent to intercept E20, reportedly going so far as to radio messages in the latest British code. Upon arriving at the designated location, UB-14 surfaced and fired a torpedo at E20 from a distance of 500 metres (550 yd). E20's crew saw the torpedo, but it was too late to avoid the weapon. The torpedo hit E20's conning tower and sank her with the loss of 21 men. UB-14 rescued nine, including E20's captain who, reportedly, had been brushing his teeth at the time of the attack.
