= HMT Royal Edward =

Canadian passenger ship

Coordinates: 36.31°N 25.51°E

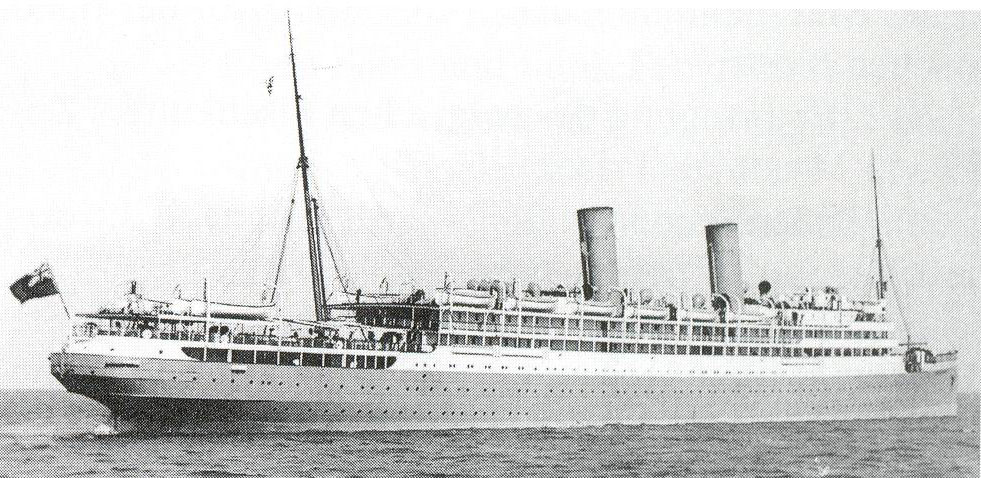
- Royal Edward, c. 1910–14

History
- Name: 1907: Cairo; 1910: Royal Edward
- Owner: 1907: Egyptian Mail SS Co; 1910: Royal Line
- Operator: 1914: (United Kingdom of Great Britain and Ireland) Admiralty
- Port of registry: 1907: (United Kingdom of Great Britain and Ireland) London; 1910: (Canada) Toronto
- Route: 1907: Marseille–Alexandria; 1910: Avonmouth–Montreal–Quebec
- Builder: Fairfield, Govan
- Yard number: 450
- Launched: July 1907
- Completed: January 1908
- Identification: UK official number 125656; code letters HMDG; by 1914: wireless call sign VDG
- Fate: Sunk, 13 August 1915

General characteristics
- Type: Ocean liner
- Tonnage: 11,117 GRT, 5,669 NRT
- Length: 526.1 ft (160.4 m) registered
- Beam: 60.2 ft (18.3 m)
- Depth: 26.8 ft (8.2 m)
- Decks: 3
- Propulsion: 3 × propellers; 3 × steam turbines
- Speed: 19 knots (35 km/h; 22 mph)
- Capacity: Passengers: 344 first class; 210 second class; 560 third class
- Troops: 1,367
- Crew: 220
- Notes: two funnels, two masts

RMS (later HMT (Note: HMT stands for hired military transport.) Royal Edward) was an ocean liner of the Canadian Northern Steamship Company that was sunk in the First World War with a large loss of life while transporting Dominion troops. She was launched in 1907 as RMS Cairo for a British mail service to Egypt.

== Design and construction ==
Cairo and sister ship Heliopolis were built by the Fairfield Shipbuilding and Engineering Company of Govan, Scotland. Cairo was launched in July 1907 and entered service in January 1908. Her registered length was 526.1 ft (160.4 m), her beam was 60.2 ft (18.3 m), and her depth was 26.8 ft (8.2 m). Her tonnages were 11,117 gross register tons (GRT) and 5,669 net register tons (NRT).

She was powered by three steam turbines that drove three propellers by direct drive, giving her a speed of up to 19 knots (35 km/h; 22 mph). She had berths for up to 1,114 passengers in three classes: 344 in first class, 210 in second class, and 560 in third.

== Prewar career ==
RMS Royal Edward, postcard

Cairo entered service for the Egyptian Mail Steamship Company, a British-owned company that provided a fast mail service between Marseille and Alexandria. The service was not successful and Cairo and sister ship Heliopolis were laid up in 1909 when the service ended.

Both ships were sold to the newly established Toronto-based Canadian Northern Steamship Company, a subsidiary of the Canadian Northern Railway, in 1910, operating under its Royal Line brand. Cairo was renamed Royal Edward, Heliopolis Royal George, and they were refitted for the North Atlantic. Royal Edward sailed from Avonmouth to Montreal in the summer and to Halifax in the winter. At the outbreak of World War I Royal Edward and Royal George were requisitioned for use as troopships.

== World War I ==
Wreck location, in the Mediterranean Sea

Royal Edward was used to bring Canadian troops to Europe before being used as an internment ship anchored off Southend-on-Sea.

On 28 July 1915, Royal Edward embarked 1,367 officers and men at Avonmouth. (Note: The Times reported in 1915 she was carrying 32 officers, 1350 troops and a crew of 220, a total of 1602 on board.) The majority were reinforcements for the British 29th Infantry Division, with members of the Royal Army Medical Corps. All were destined for Gallipoli. Royal Edward was reported off the Lizard on the evening of 28 July, and had arrived at Alexandria on 10 August, a day after sister ship Royal George had sailed from Devonport. Royal Edward sailed for Moudros on the island of Lemnos, a staging point for the Dardanelles.

On the morning of 13 August, Royal Edward passed the British hospital ship Soudan, heading in the opposite direction. Oberleutnant zur See Heino von Heimburg in the German submarine UB-14 was off the island of Kandeloussa and saw both ships. He allowed Soudan to pass unmolested, and focused his attention on the unescorted Royal Edward some six nautical miles (11 km; 6.9 mi) off Kandelioussa. He launched one of UB-14's two torpedoes from about one mile (1.6 km) away and hit Royal Edward in the stern. She sank by the stern within six minutes.

Royal Edward was able to get off an SOS before losing power, and Soudan arrived on the scene at 10:00 after making a 180° turn and rescued 440 men in six hours. Two French destroyers and some trawlers rescued another 221. According to authors James Wise and Scott Baron, Royal Edward's death toll was 935 and was high because Royal Edward had just completed a boat drill and the majority of the men were below decks re-stowing their equipment. Other sources report different numbers of casualties, from 132 to 1,386 or 1,865. An Admiralty casualty list, published in The Times in September 1915, named 13 officers and 851 troops as missing believed drowned, a total of 864 lost, including posthumous Victoria Cross recipient Cuthbert Bromley and footballer Walter Miller.

== Gallery ==
Photos taken aboard the hospital ship Soudan.

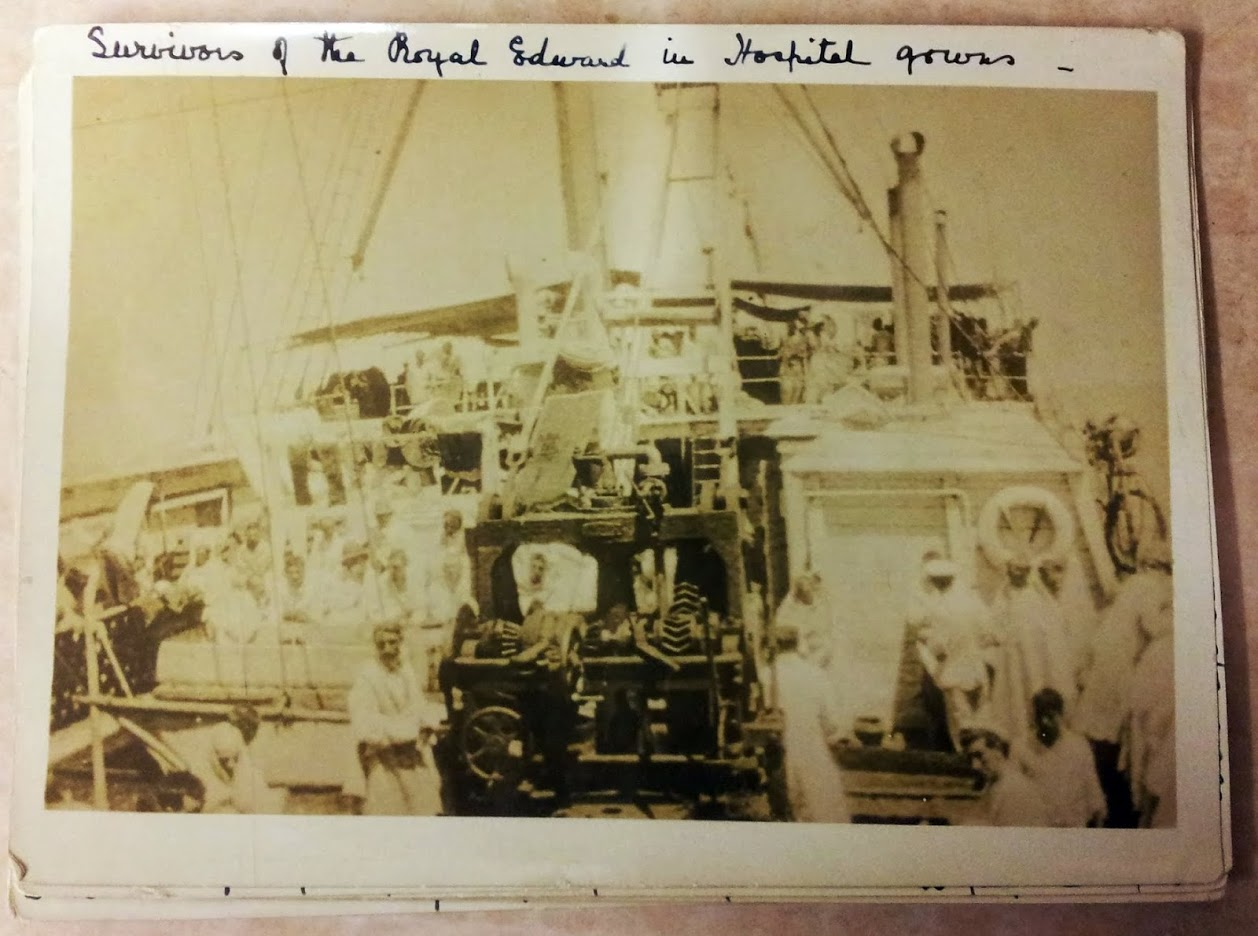
Survivors of Royal Edward in hospital gowns

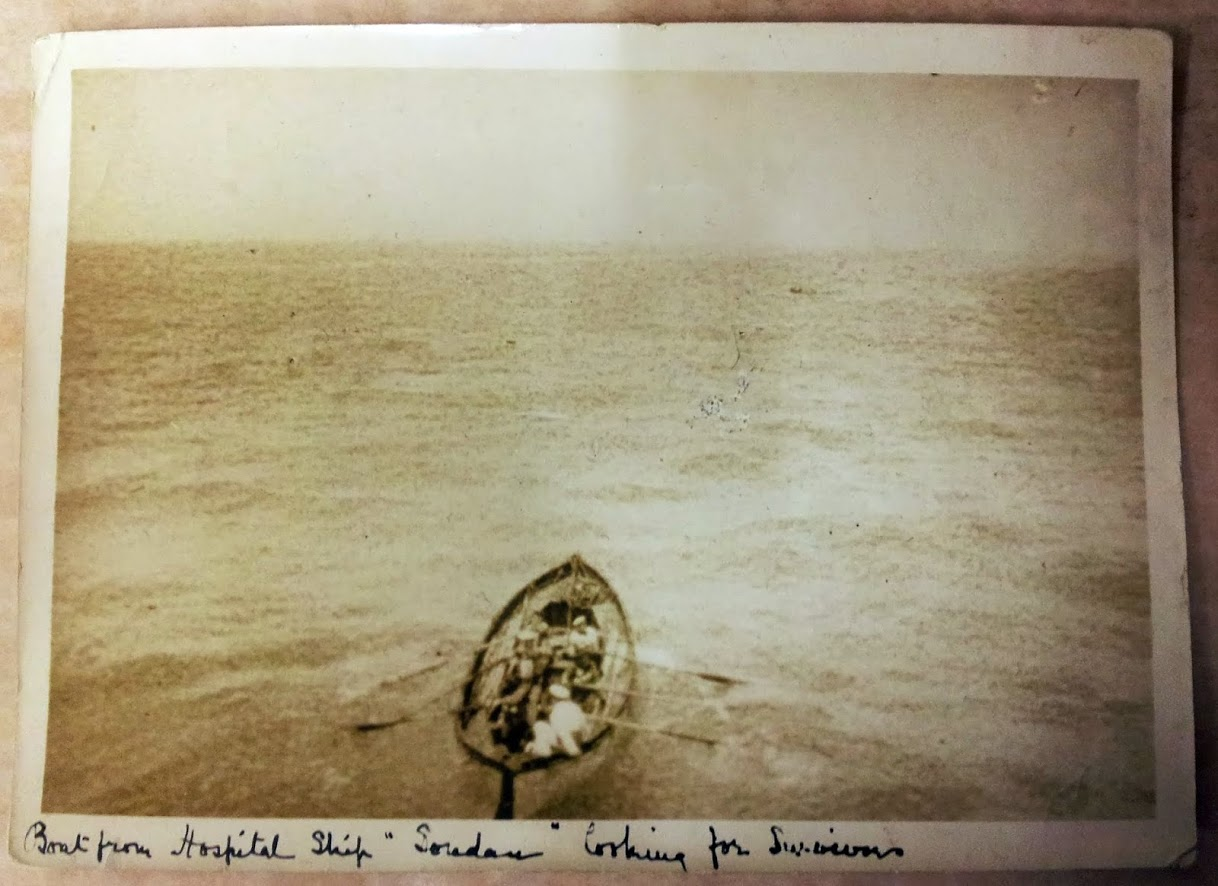
Boat from the hospital ship Soudan looking for survivors

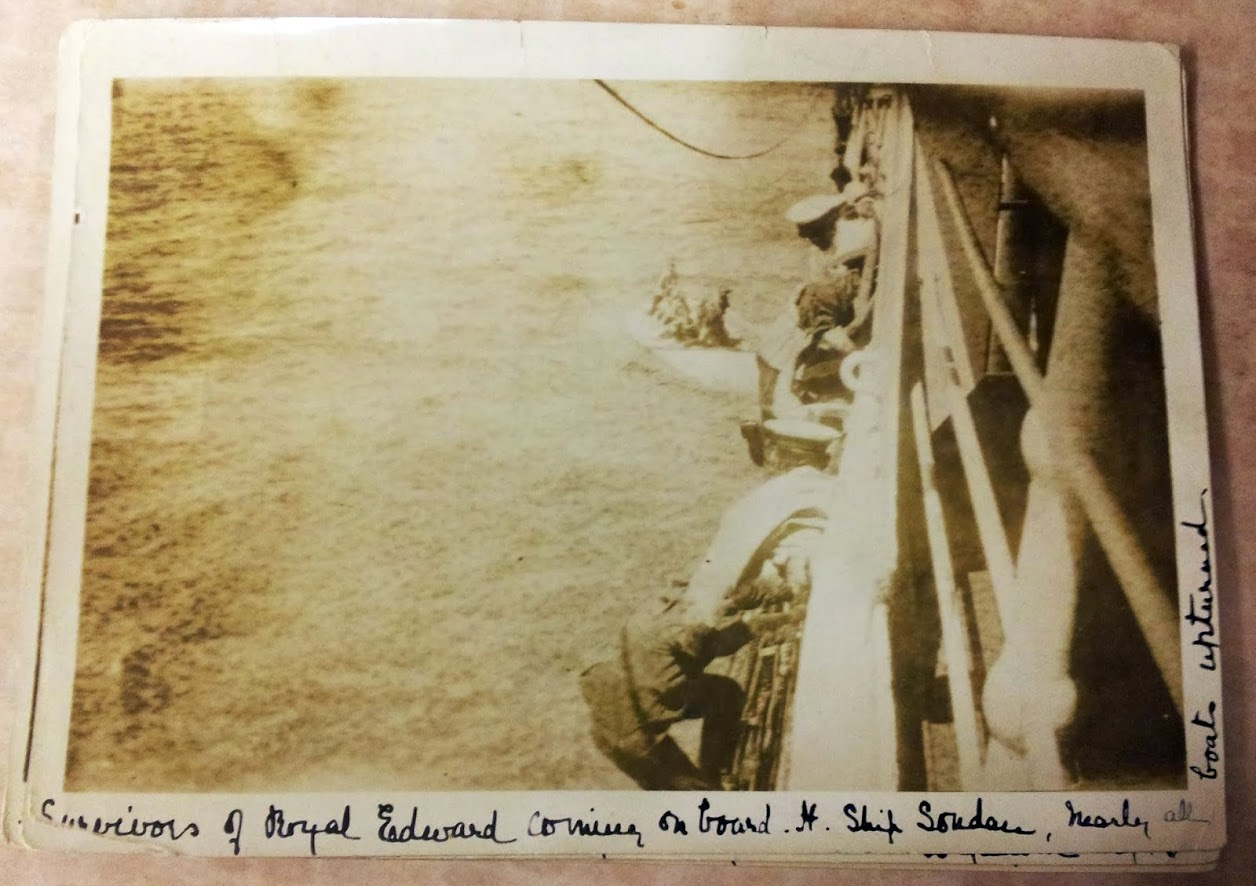
Survivors of HMT Royal Edward boarding Soudan

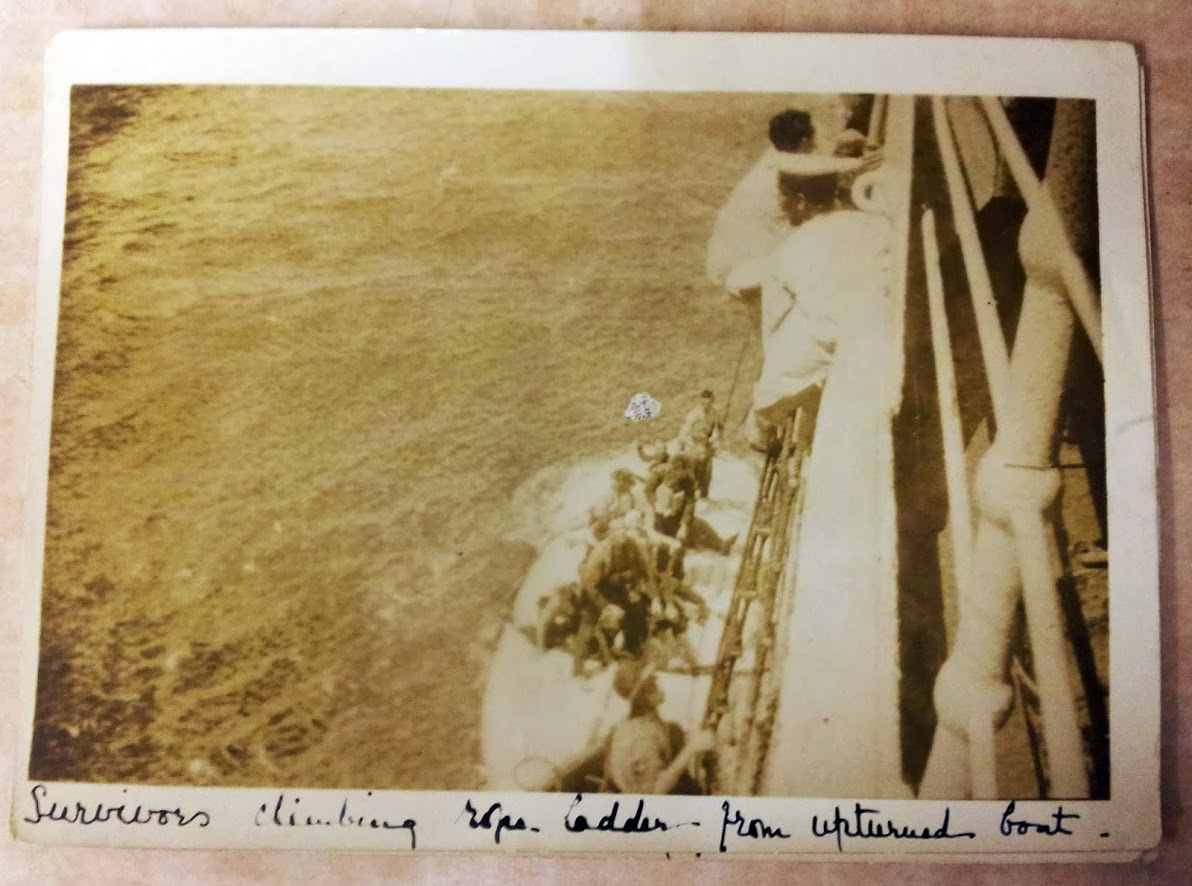
Survivors on the rope ladder

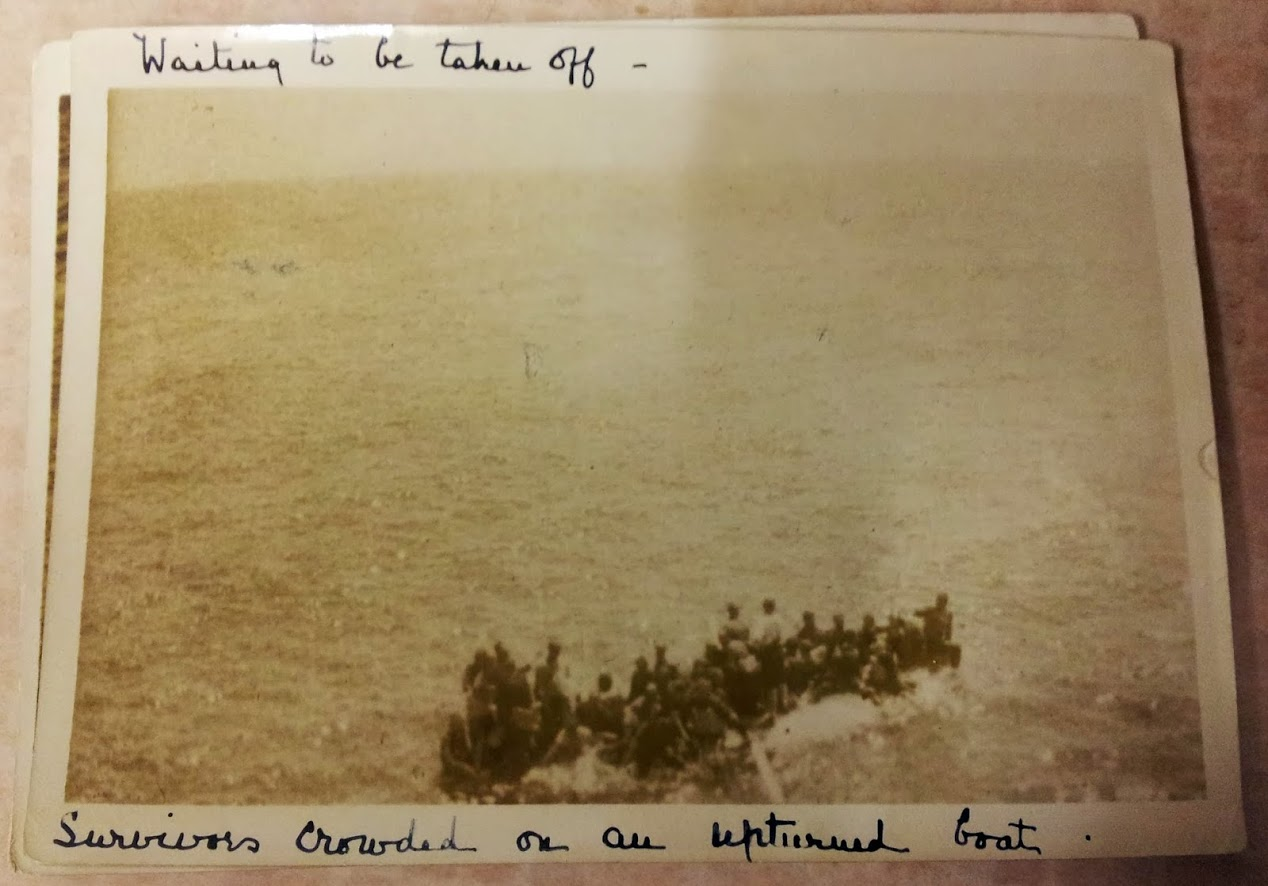
Survivors of HMT Royal Edward on an upturned boat

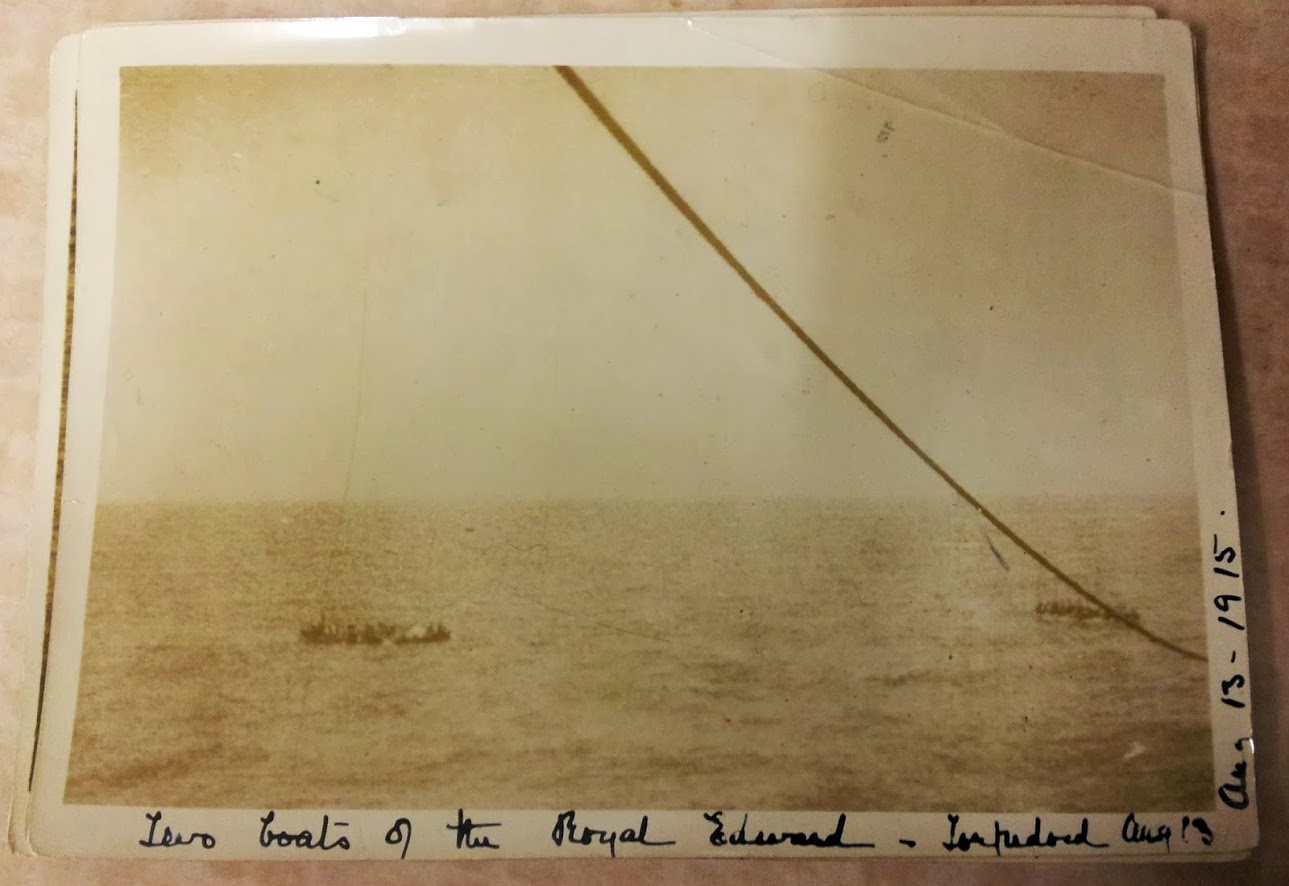
Two boats of Royal Edward as sighted by Soudan

== See also ==
- List by death toll of ships sunk by submarines

== Bibliography ==
- Bonsor, N. R. P. (1975). North Atlantic Seaway: An Illustrated History of the Passenger Services Linking the Old World with the New (Enl. and rev. ed.). New York: Arco Pub. Co. OCLC 1891992.
- Gardiner, Robert, ed. (1985). Conway's All the World's Fighting Ships 1906–1921. Annapolis, Maryland: Naval Institute Press. ISBN 978-0-87021-907-8. OCLC 12119866.
- Gilbert, Martin (1996) [1994]. The First World War: A Complete History (1st Owl books ed.). New York: Henry Holt. ISBN 978-0-8050-7617-2. OCLC 34792651.
- Hendrickson, Robert (1984). The Ocean Almanac (1st ed.). Garden City, New York: Doubleday. ISBN 978-0-385-14077-5. OCLC 8532256.
- Lloyd's Register of Shipping. Vol. I.–Steamers. London: Lloyd's Register of Shipping. 1914.
- The Marconi Press Agency Ltd (1914). The Year Book of Wireless Telegraphy and Telephony. London: The Marconi Press Agency Ltd.
- Tennent, A. J. (2006) [1990]. British Merchant Ships Sunk by U boats in the 1914–1918 War. Penzance: Periscope Publishing. ISBN 1-904381-36-7.
- Wise, James E. & Baron, Scott (2004). Soldiers Lost at Sea: A Chronicle of Troopship Disasters. Annapolis, MD: Naval Institute Press. ISBN 978-1-59114-966-8. OCLC 52182511.
