= Nara Burnu =

Cape in Turkey

Coordinates: 40°11′47″N 26°24′52″E

Nara Burnu (Turkish "Cape Nara"), formerly Nağara Burnu, in English Nagara Point, and in older sources Point Pesquies, is a headland on the Anatolian side of the Dardanelles Straits, north of Çanakkale.

It is the narrowest and, with 113 metres (371 ft), the deepest, section of the Dardanelles Strait. As a result, it is also the point where the surface current from the Black Sea to the Aegean Sea is the strongest, with 1.5 to 2 times the normal rate, occasionally reaching the speed of 5 nautical miles (9.3 km) per hour. The undercurrent is 0.5–5 nautical miles (0.93–9.26 km) per hour, flowing in the opposite direction. The ancient and medieval city of Abydos is located at the Nara promontory.

Due to the narrowness of the straits at this point, the site was often chosen for crossings of the Dardanelles by armies, beginning with the Achaemenid monarch Xerxes I during his Invasion of Greece in 480 BC, who deployed pontoon bridges to allow his army to cross on foot.
