= Bayly =

Bayly is a surname. Notable people with the surname include:

- Ada Ellen Bayly (1857–1903), English novelist and women's suffrage supporter
- Alfred Bayly (1866–1907), New Zealand rugby union player and administrator, and cricketer
- Andrew Bayly (born 1962), New Zealand businessman, adventurer and politician
- Benjamin Bayly (1671–1720), English divine (theologian)
- Benjamin deForest Bayly (1903–1994), Canadian electrical engineer, inventor and professor
- Cameron Bayly (born 1990), Australian racing cyclist
- Charles Bayly (governor) (fl. c. 1630–1680), first overseas governor of the Hudson's Bay Company
- Charles Ellis Bayly (fl. 1825), English cricketer
- Christopher Alan Bayly (1945–2015), British historian specialising in British Imperial, Indian and global history
- Edward Bayly (1684–1741), Irish landowner and politician
- Frank Bayly (1860–1948), New Zealand cricketer
- George Bayly (1856–1938), New Zealand cricketer
- Harry Bayly (1862–1935), New Zealand cricketer
- Henry Bayly (disambiguation)
- Jaime Bayly (born 1965), Peruvian journalist and writer, host and producer of the Bayly talk show
- John Bayly (priest, died 1633), guardian of Christ's Hospital, Ruthin, and chaplain to Charles I
- John Bayly (priest, died 1831), Dean of Lismore
- John Percy Bayly (1882–1963), Fijian businessman, politician and philanthropist
- Joseph T. Bayly (1920–1986), American author and publishing executive
- Lewis Bayly (bishop) (died 1631), English author and Anglican bishop
- Lewis Bayly (Royal Navy officer) (1857–1938), British Royal Navy admiral
- Lewis Bayly, birth name of Lewis Bayly Wallis (1775–1848), British Army lieutenant-colonel and Member of Parliament
- Lorraine Bayly (1937–2026), Australian actress
- Martin Bayly (born 1966), Irish former footballer and manager
- Maurice Beddow Bayly (died 1962), English physician, anti-vivisection activist and anti-vaccination campaigner
- Nathaniel Bayly (c. 1726–1798), English owner of West Indies plantations and slave, and Member of Parliament
- Sir Nicholas Bayly, 2nd Baronet (1709–1782), British landowner and Member of Parliament
- Patrick Bayly (1914–1998), British Royal Navy vice-admiral
- Ritchie Bayly (born 1962), Irish former soccer player
- Robert Bayly (born 1988), Irish footballer
- Stephen Bayly (born 1942), American film producer and director
- Thomas Bayly (disambiguation)
- Walter Bayly (1869–1950), New Zealand rugby union player
- William Bayly (astronomer) (1737–1810), English astronomer
- William Bayly (barrister) (1540–1612), English barrister and politician
- William Alfred Bayly (1906–1934), New Zealand farmer and convicted murderer
- W. R. Bayly (1867–1937), educator in South Australia
- Zachary Bayly (military officer) (1841–1916), South African colonial military commander
- Zachary Bayly (planter) (1721–1769), planter and politician in Jamaica

== See also ==
- Bailey (surname)
- Bayley (disambiguation)
- Baillie (surname)
- Bailie (given name)
