= List of Taranaki representative cricketers =

List of cricketers

This is a list of cricketers who played first-class cricket for the Taranaki cricket team in New Zealand. Taranaki played a total of eight first-class matches between the 1882–83 season and 1897–98. After a single match against Auckland in March 1883, the team did not play another first-class match for nine seasons. The other seven first-class matches came between the 1891–92 season and 1897–98. The team competed in the Hawke Cup competition for minor associations from 1926 to 1927, following the amalgamation of the North Taranaki and South Taranaki teams which had played in the competition since the inaugural season in 1910–11.

Players are listed with the seasons in which they played. Some players also appeared in first-class or Hawke Cup matches for other teams.

== B ==
- Alfred Bayly, 1891/92–1897/98
- Frank Bayly, 1882/83
- George Bayly, 1882/83–1897/98
- Harry Bayly, 1891/92
- Charles Beresford, 1882/83

== C ==
- Thomas Campbell, 1894/95
- Ernest Cole, 1896/97
- Henry Coutts, 1882/83–1891/92
- William Crawshaw 1896/97–1897/98
- John Cunningham, 1882/83

== D ==
- William D'Arcy, 1891/92

== E ==
- Harry Elliott, 1891/98–1897/98

== F ==
- Michael Foley, 1882/83
- Louis Fowler, 1897/98
- John Fulton, 1882/83

== G ==
- Matthew Goodson, 1891/92
- George Grindrod, 1896/97
- George Gudgeon, 1897/98

== H ==
- Herbert Haggett, 1894/95–1897/98
- George Harden, 1894/95
- George Heenan, 1891/92–1897/98

== I ==
- Ernest Izard, 1896/97–1897/98

== L ==
- Edmund Lash, 1897/98
- Roger Lucena, 1891/92
- Robert Lusk, 1891/92–1894/95

== M ==
- Bernard McCarthy, 1894/95–1897/98
- Walter Marcroft, 1894/95
- Joy Marshall, 1891/92
- John Mathieson, 1882/83
- William Mills, 1894/95
- Francis Moore, 1894/95–1897/98
- Henry Moore, 1894/95

== P ==
- Henry Parrington, 1882/83
- Percy Pratt, 1894/95–1897/98

== R ==
- James Read, 1882/83
- Frederick Riddiford, 1882/83–1891/92
- Frederick Robertson, 1897/98

== S ==
- William Salmon, 1891/92
- Ernest Shove, 1891/92
- George Syme, 1891/92–1897/98

== T ==
- Arthur Tonks, 1891/92
- William Tucker, 1891/92
