= Lewis Bayly (Royal Navy officer) =

Royal Navy Admiral (1857–1938)

Admiral Sir Lewis Bayly KCB KCMG CVO
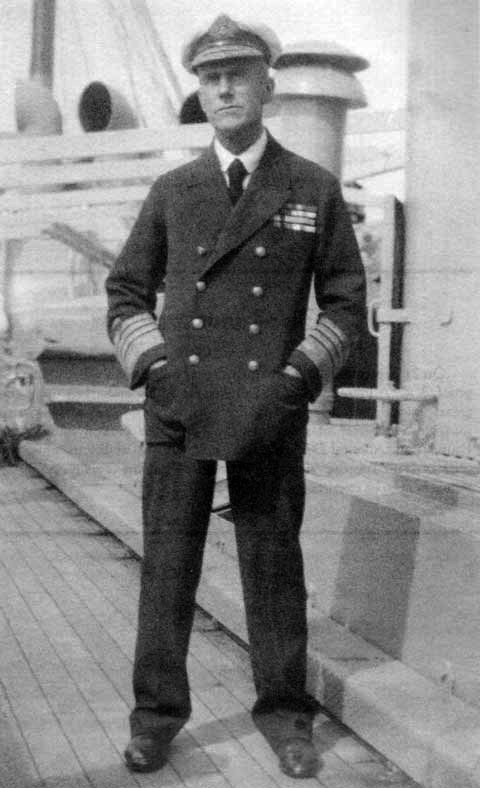
- Admiral Sir Lewis Bayly, 1915
- Born: 28 September 1857; Charlton, Kent, England
- Died: 16 May 1938 (aged 80); London, England
- Military career
- Allegiance: United Kingdom
- Branch: Royal Navy
- Service years: 1870–1919
- Rank: Admiral
- Commands: Coast of Ireland (1915–19); Royal Naval College, Greenwich (1915); Channel Fleet (1914–15); 1st Battle Squadron (1914); 3rd Battle Squadron (1913–14); 1st Battlecruiser Squadron (1912–13); 1st Cruiser Squadron (1911–12); Royal Naval War College (1908–11); HMS Topaze (1908); HMS Attentive (1907–08); HMS Queen (1904–07); HMS Talbot (1902–04)
- Conflicts: Third Anglo-Ashanti War; Anglo-Egyptian War; First World War
- Awards: Knight Commander of the Order of the Bath; Knight Commander of the Order of St Michael and St George; Commander of the Royal Victorian Order; Grand Cross of the Order of the Dannebrog (Denmark); Commander of the Legion of Honour (France); Navy Distinguished Service Medal (United States)

Admiral Sir Lewis Bayly, KCB, KCMG, CVO (28 September 1857 – 16 May 1938) was a Royal Navy officer who served during the First World War.

== Early life and career ==
Bayly was born at Woolwich on 28 September 1857. He was a great-grandnephew of Admiral Sir Richard Goodwin Keats. Bayly joined the Royal Navy in 1870. He served in the Third Anglo-Ashanti War in 1873 and against pirates in the Congo Basin in 1875. He later served on the armoured frigate HMS Agincourt and in the Anglo-Egyptian War of 1882. Bayly married in 1892 Yves Henrietta Stella, daughter of Henry Annesley Voysey; there was no issue of the marriage.

He was posted to the torpedo school HMS Vernon in late March 1900, then on 15 July 1900 he was appointed Naval Attaché to the United States and Japan, serving as such until he was recalled in July 1902.

In July 1902, Bayly became commanding officer of the protected cruiser HMS Talbot, serving on the China Station. He was given command of the destroyers of the Home Fleet (1907–1908) with the scout cruiser HMS Attentive as his flagship. On 22 March 1908, Bayly was appointed a naval aide-de-camp to King Edward VII. He was then given a shore command as president of the Royal Naval War College (1908–1911). Before the outbreak of the First World War he was given command successively of the 1st Cruiser Squadron (1911–1912), the 1st Battlecruiser Squadron (1912–13), and the 3rd Battle Squadron (1913–1914).

== First World War ==
During the early months of the First World War, Bayly commanded the 1st Battle Squadron. He was in command of the rescue operation when the dreadnought battleship HMS Audacious was mined and sunk on 27 October 1914.

In December 1914, he was appointed to command the Channel Fleet, flying his flag in the predreadnought battleship HMS Lord Nelson. Under Bayly's command, the 5th Battle Squadron spent 31 December 1914 in the English Channel participating in gunnery exercises off the Isle of Portland, supported by the Topaze-class light cruisers HMS Topaze and HMS Diamond. After the exercises, the fleet remained at sea for the night on patrol even though German submarine activity had been reported in the area. With rough sea conditions and the wind increasing, submarine attacks would have been difficult to carry out effectively and so were not thought to be a significant threat. Nonetheless, the predreadnought battleship HMS Formidable was torpedoed and sunk by the German submarine U-24. Bayly was later criticised for not taking proper precautions during the exercises, but was cleared of the charge of negligence.

In January 1915 Bayly was made president of the Royal Naval College, Greenwich. In July 1915 he was made Senior Officer on the Coast of Ireland at Queenstown, Ireland. In 1917 the title became Commander-in-Chief, Coast of Ireland. He held this post until 1919. In this function Bayly was tasked with keeping the approaches to Great Britain safe from U-boat attacks. In 1917, Bayly, promoted to admiral, was given command of a mixed British-American force defending the Western Approaches. He took as his chief of staff the American Captain Joel R. P. Pringle. Bayly had a good working relation with his American counterpart, William Sims.

Bayly retired in 1919. He died in London in 1938.

== Notes ==
Military offices
Preceded by Sir Alexander Bethell	President of the Royal Naval College, Greenwich; 1915	Succeeded by Sir Henry Jackson
Preceded by Sir Charles Coke	Commander-in-Chief, Coast of Ireland; 1915–1919	Succeeded by Sir Reginald Tupper
