= Harry Elliott (New Zealand cricketer) =

New Zealand cricketer

Personal information
- Full name: Harry Sinclair Elliott
- Born: 11 March 1870; Nelson, New Zealand
- Died: 2 November 1941 (aged 71); Taranaki, New Zealand
- Source: ESPNcricinfo, 28 June 2016

Harry Elliott (11 March 1870 – 2 November 1941) was a New Zealand cricketer. He played three first-class matches for Taranaki between 1891 and 1898.

== See also ==
- List of Taranaki representative cricketers
