= William Alexander D'Arcy =

New Zealand cricketer

William D'Arcy
Personal information
- Full name: William Alexander D'Arcy
- Born: 30 January 1863; Ōrongorongo Valley, New Zealand
- Died: 23 August 1940 (aged 77); Wanganui, New Zealand

William Alexander D'Arcy (30 January 1863 – 23 October 1940) was a New Zealand cricketer who played one first-class match for Taranaki. He was born in Ōrongorongo and died in Wanganui, aged 77.

== See also ==
- List of Taranaki representative cricketers
