= Harry Bayly =

New Zealand cricketer

Personal information
- Born: 27 July 1862; New Plymouth, New Zealand
- Died: 29 May 1935 (aged 72); Auckland, New Zealand
- Source: ESPNcricinfo, 27 June 2016

Harry Bayly (27 July 1862 – 29 May 1935) was a New Zealand cricketer. He played two first-class matches for Taranaki in 1891/92.

His brothers included:

- Alfred Bayly (1866–1901), Taranaki cricket and rugby representative. New Zealand rugby representative and captain.
- Frank Bayly (1860–1948), Taranaki cricket and rugby representative.
- George Bayly (1856–1938), Taranaki cricket and rugby representative. President of the Taranaki and New Zealand Rugby Union.
- Walter Bayly (1869–1950), Taranaki and New Zealand rugby representative.

== See also ==
- List of Taranaki representative cricketers
