= Thomas Campbell (New Zealand cricketer) =

New Zealand cricketer

Personal information
- Full name: Thomas Tasman Campbell
- Born: 10 August 1871; Wellington, New Zealand
- Died: 7 July 1950 (aged 78); Taranaki, New Zealand
- Source: ESPNcricinfo, 27 June 2016

Thomas Campbell (10 August 1871 – 7 July 1950) was a New Zealand cricketer. He played one first-class match for Taranaki in 1894/95.

== See also ==
- List of Taranaki representative cricketers
