= Walter Bayly =

New Zealand rugby union player

- Born: 18 November 1869 Waitara, New Zealand
- Died: 20 August 1950 (aged 80) Auckland, New Zealand
- School: New Plymouth Boys' High School
- Notable relative(s): Alfred Bayly (brother); Frank Bayly (brother); George Bayly (brother); Harry Bayly (brother)

Rugby union career
- Position: Wing forward
Provincial / State sides
Years	Team	Apps	(Points)
1889–94	Taranaki Rugby Union		
International career
Years	Team	Apps	(Points)
1894	New Zealand	1	(0)

Walter Bayly (18 November 1869 – 20 August 1950) was a New Zealand rugby union player. Bayly was educated at New Plymouth Boys' High School.

He played at Wing forward and represented the Taranaki Rugby Union at provincial level from 1889 to 1894 and the North Island in 1894: He played club rugby for Clifton and from 1894 for Stratford.

At the age of 24, Walter played one match for New Zealand, against New South Wales at Lancaster Park in Christchurch on 15 September 1894. New South Wales had lost seven out of its eight games prior to this match including 6–21 against Taranaki, in which Walter and his older brother Alfred Bayly both played. However, New Zealand lost the game by 6 points to 8. Alfred Bayly who was the captain in this match, scored a try before leaving the field injured with concussion which seriously affected the home side.

Walter was one of six brothers who represented the Taranaki cricket team and/or the Taranaki Rugby Football Union, including

- Alfred Bayly (1866–1901), Taranaki cricket team (1891–1898) and rugby (1883–1889). New Zealand rugby representative and captain. President of the Taranaki and New Zealand Rugby Union (in 1907)
- Charles Bayly, Taranaki rugby (1889–93).
- Frank Bayly (1860–1948), Taranaki cricket (1882–83) and rugby (1891–1900).
- George Bayly (1856–1938), Taranaki cricket (1883–98) and rugby (1883). President of the Taranaki and New Zealand Rugby Union (in 1898).
- Harry Bayly (1862–1935), Taranaki cricket (1891–92) and rugby (1883).
