= HMS Formidable (1898) =

Pre-dreadnought battleship of the British Royal Navy

Coordinates: 50°13′N 3°04′W

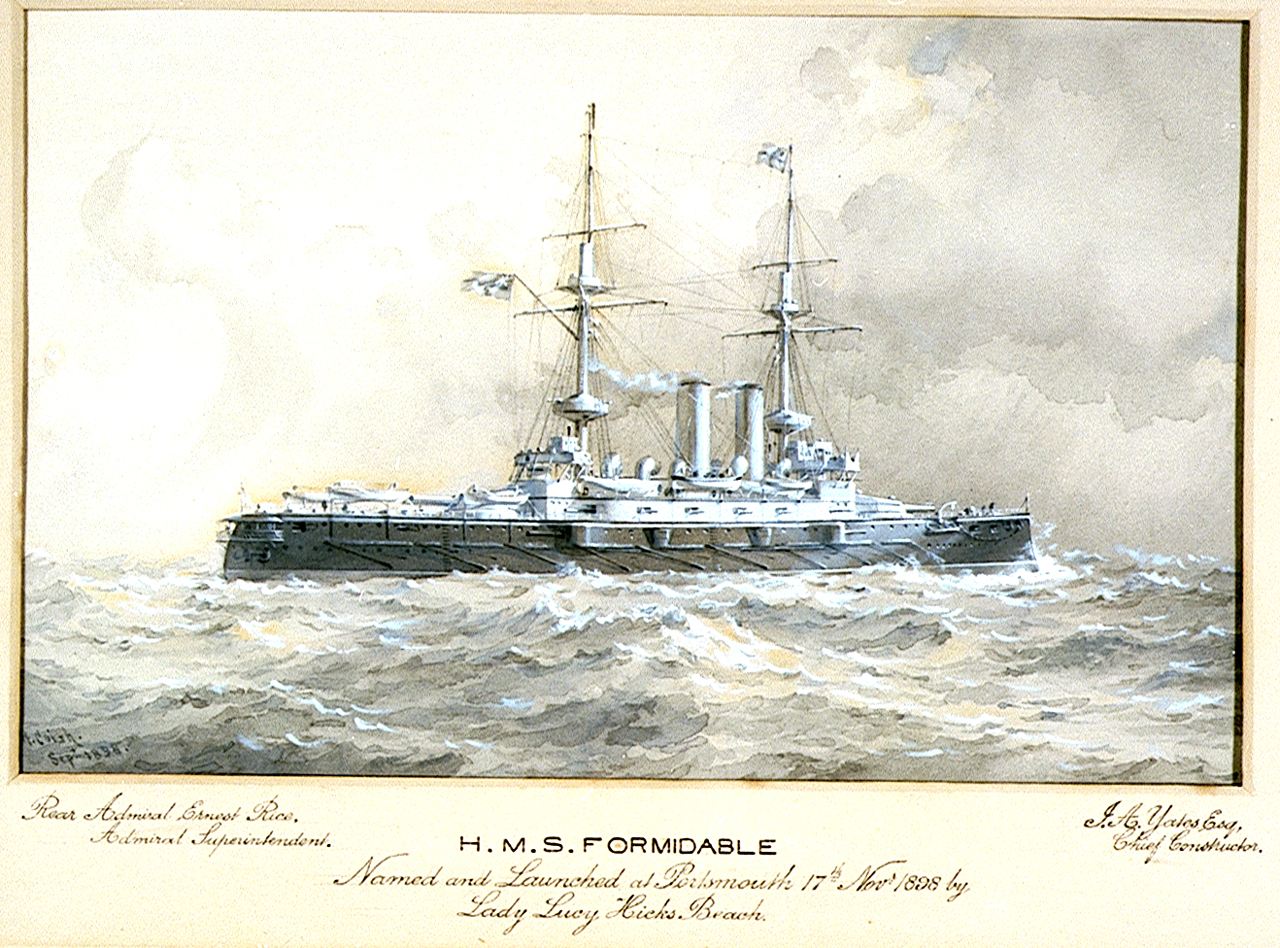
- Painting of HMS Formidable, September 1898

History

United Kingdom
- Name: HMS Formidable
- Ordered: 1897 Programme
- Builder: Portsmouth Dockyard
- Laid down: 21 March 1898
- Launched: 17 November 1898
- Completed: September 1901
- Commissioned: 10 October 1901
- Fate: Sunk, 1 January 1915

General characteristics
- Class & type: Formidable-class battleship
- Displacement: Normal: 14,500 long tons (14,700 t); Full load: 15,800 long tons (16,100 t)
- Length: 431 ft 9 in (131.6 m) o/a
- Beam: 75 ft (22.9 m)
- Draught: 25 ft 11 in (7.90 m)
- Installed power: 20 × water-tube boilers; 15,000 ihp (11,000 kW)
- Propulsion: 2 × triple-expansion steam engines; 2 × screw propellers
- Speed: 18 knots (33 km/h; 21 mph)
- Range: 5,500 nmi (10,190 km; 6,330 mi) at 10 knots (19 km/h; 12 mph)
- Complement: 780
- Armament: 4 × BL 12-inch (305 mm) Mk IX guns; 12 × BL 6 in (152 mm) Mk VII guns; 10 × QF 12-pounder guns; 6 × QF 3-pounder guns; 4 × 18 in (457 mm) torpedo tubes
- Armour: Belt: 9 in (229 mm); Bulkheads: 9–12 in (229–305 mm); Barbettes: 12 in (305 mm); Turrets: 10 in (254 mm); Casemates: 6 in (152 mm); Conning tower: 14 in (356 mm); Deck: 1–3 in (25–76 mm)

HMS Formidable, the third of four ships of that name to serve in the Royal Navy, was the lead ship of her class of pre-dreadnought battleships. The ship was laid down in March 1898, was launched in November that year, and was completed in September 1901. Formidable served initially with the Mediterranean Fleet, transferring to the Channel Fleet in 1908. In 1912, she was assigned to the 5th Battle Squadron, which was stationed at Nore.

Following the outbreak of the First World War in August 1914, the squadron conducted operations in the English Channel, and was based at Sheerness to guard against a possible German invasion. In the first days of the war, the 5th Battle Squadron covered the crossing of the British Expeditionary Force to France. On 31 December, the squadron was conducting training exercises in the English Channel, and despite the risk of German submarines, was without anti-submarine protection; the German U-24 stalked the ships during the day and in the early hours of 1 January 1915, torpedoed Formidable twice, sinking her with heavy loss of life.

== Design ==
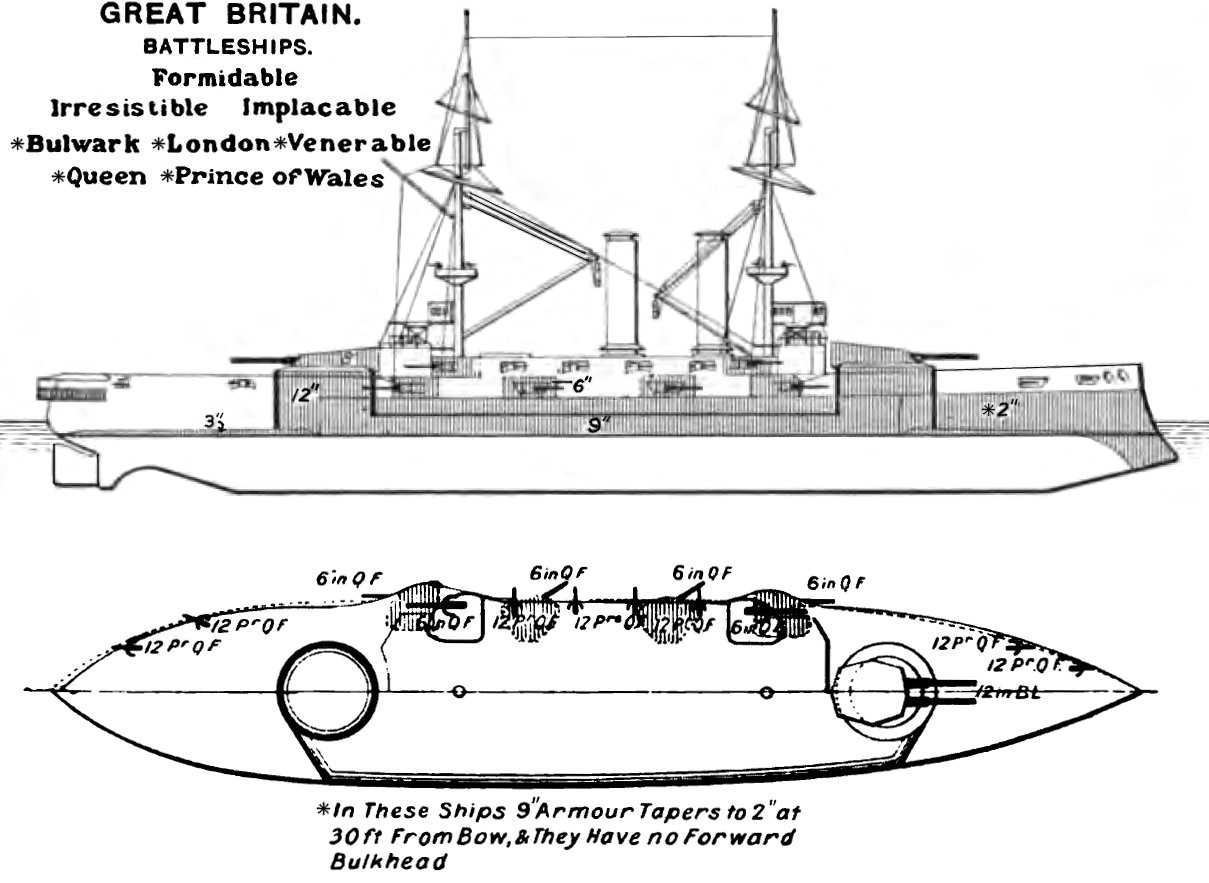
Line-drawing of the Formidable class

The design for the Formidable class was prepared in 1897; it was an incremental improvement over the preceding Majestic and Canopus classes. Formidable adopted the larger size of the Majestics, while taking the stronger Krupp armour of the Canopus design. In addition, the new design incorporated longer (and thus more powerful) main and secondary guns and an improved hull form. These characteristics produced a ship with better armour protection than either earlier class, the same high speed of Canopus.

Formidable was 431 feet 9 inches (131.6 m) long overall, with a beam of 75 ft (22.9 m) and a draught of 25 ft 11 in (7.90 m). She displaced 14,500 long tons (14,700 t) normally and up to 15,800 long tons (16,100 t) fully loaded. Her crew numbered 780 officers and ratings. The Formidable-class ships were powered by a pair of 3-cylinder triple-expansion engines, with steam provided by twenty Belleville boilers. The boilers were trunked into two funnels located amidships. The Formidable-class ships had a top speed of 18 knots (33 km/h; 21 mph) from 15,000 indicated horsepower (11,000 kW).

Formidable had a main battery of four 12-inch (305 mm) 40-calibre guns mounted in twin-gun turrets fore and aft; these guns were mounted in circular barbettes that allowed all-around loading or elevation. The ships also mounted a secondary battery of twelve 6-inch (152 mm) 45-calibre guns mounted in casemates, in addition to ten 12-pounder 3 in (76 mm) guns and six 3-pounder 47 mm (1.9 in) guns for defence against torpedo boats. As was customary for battleships of the period, she was also equipped with four 18-inch (457 mm) torpedo tubes submerged in the hull.

Formidable had an armoured belt that was 9 inches (229 mm) thick; the transverse bulkheads on either end of the belt were 9 to 12 in (229 to 305 mm) thick. Her main battery turrets sides were 8 to 10 in (203 to 254 mm) thick, atop 12 in (305 mm) barbettes, and the casemate battery was protected with 6 in of Krupp steel. Her conning tower had 14 in (356 mm) thick sides as well. She was fitted with two armoured decks, 1 and 3 in (25 and 76 mm) thick, respectively.

== Service history ==
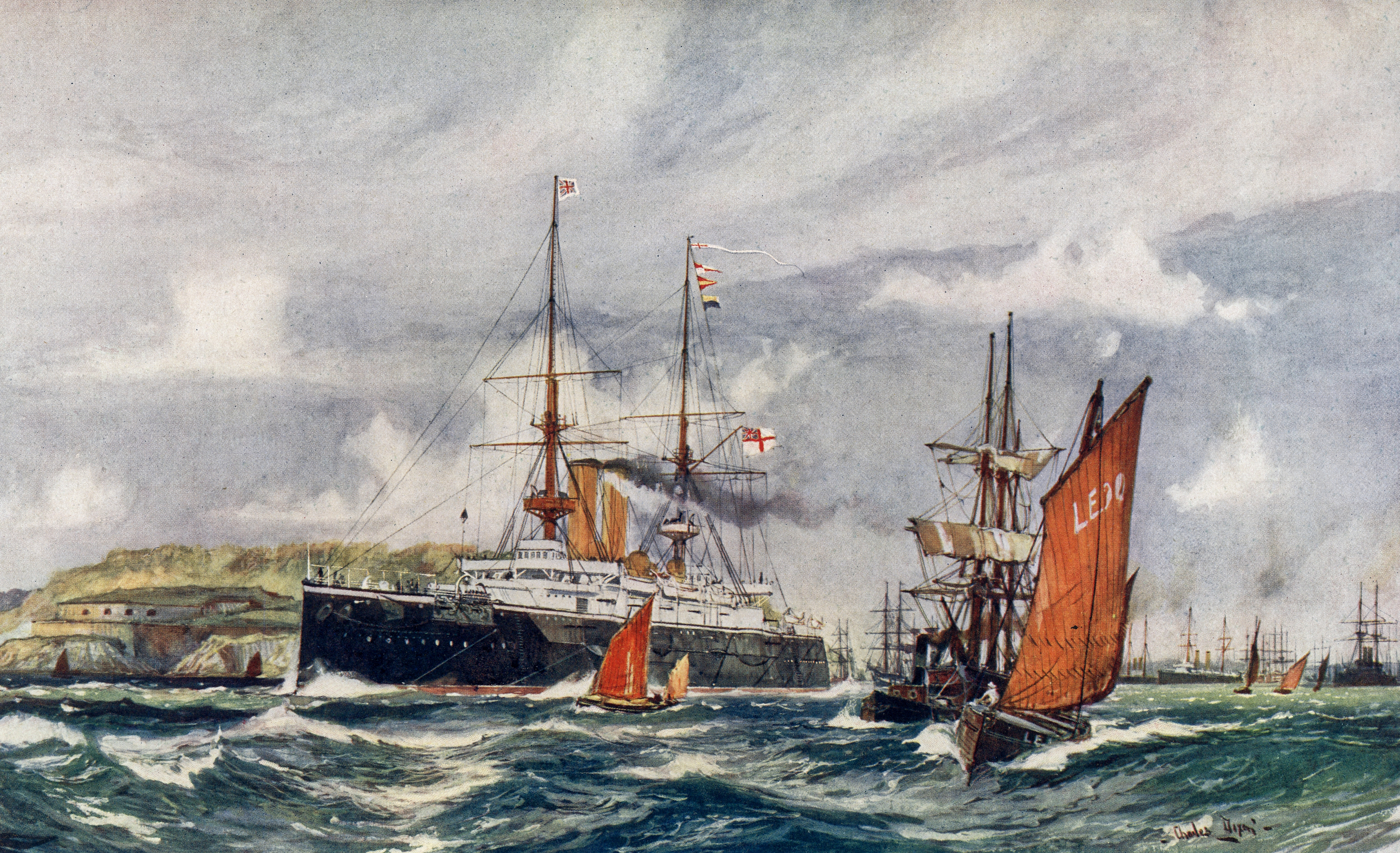
HMS Formidable in Plymouth Sound, by Charles Dixon

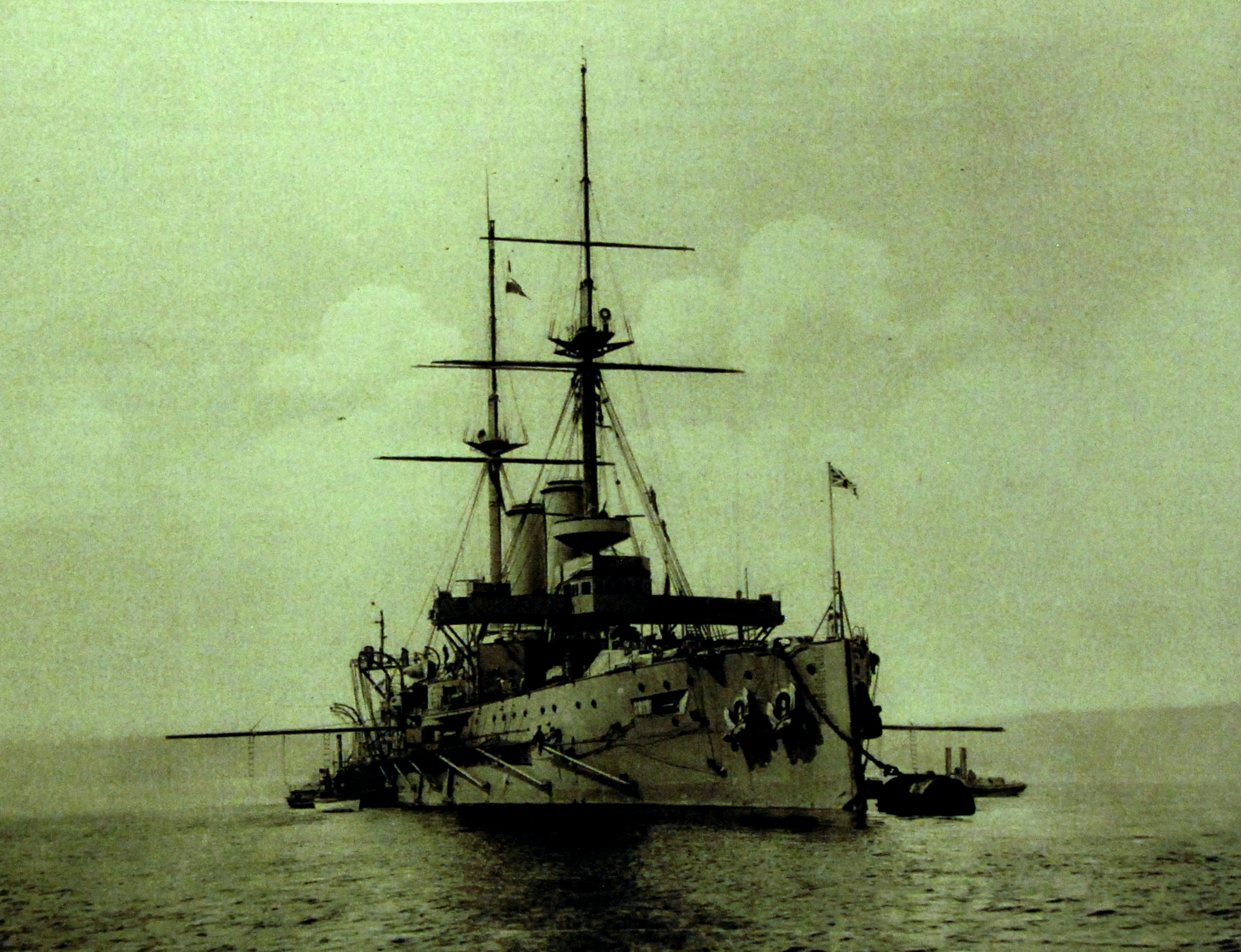
Starboard bow view of Formidable

HMS Formidable was laid down at Portsmouth Dockyard on 21 March 1898 and launched on 17 November 1898; she was, at the time of her launching, very incomplete, and she was launched primarily to clear the slipway so construction could begin on the battleship London. Formidable was completed in September 1901, and was commissioned at Portsmouth on 10 October for service in the Mediterranean Fleet. Captain Alexander William Chisholm-Batten paid off HMS Resolution on 9 October and he and his crew turned over to Formidable on the following day. In September 1902 she visited the Aegean Sea with other ships of the station for combined manoeuvres near Nauplia, and in January the following year she cruised in the water off Syracuse, Sicily. Later in 1903 she was escort ship to the royal yacht HMY Victoria and Albert when the King visited the Mediterranean. She began a refit at Malta in 1904 which lasted until April 1905, and in April 1908 transferred to the Channel Fleet.

Paid off at Chatham Dockyard on 17 August 1908, Formidable began another refit and recommissioned on 20 April 1909 for service in the 1st Division, Home Fleet, stationed at the Nore. On 29 May, she transferred to the Atlantic Fleet. In May 1912, Formidable was reduced to a nucleus crew and transferred to the 5th Battle Squadron in the Second Fleet, Home Fleets, again at the Nore, where she served until the outbreak of war in August 1914. Hard steaming during this service led to her developing serious machinery problems.

=== First World War ===
At the beginning of the First World War, Formidable and the 5th Battle Squadron were based at Portland and assigned to the Channel Fleet to defend the English Channel. After covering the safe transportation of the British Expeditionary Force to France in August 1914, Formidable took part in the transportation of the Portsmouth Marine Battalion to Ostend on 25 August. On 14 November, Formidable and the other ships of the 5th Battle Squadron were rebased at Sheerness because of concern that a German invasion of Great Britain was in the offing. The squadron was relieved by Duncan-class battleships of the 6th Battle Squadron and transferred to Portland on 30 December.

==== Loss ====
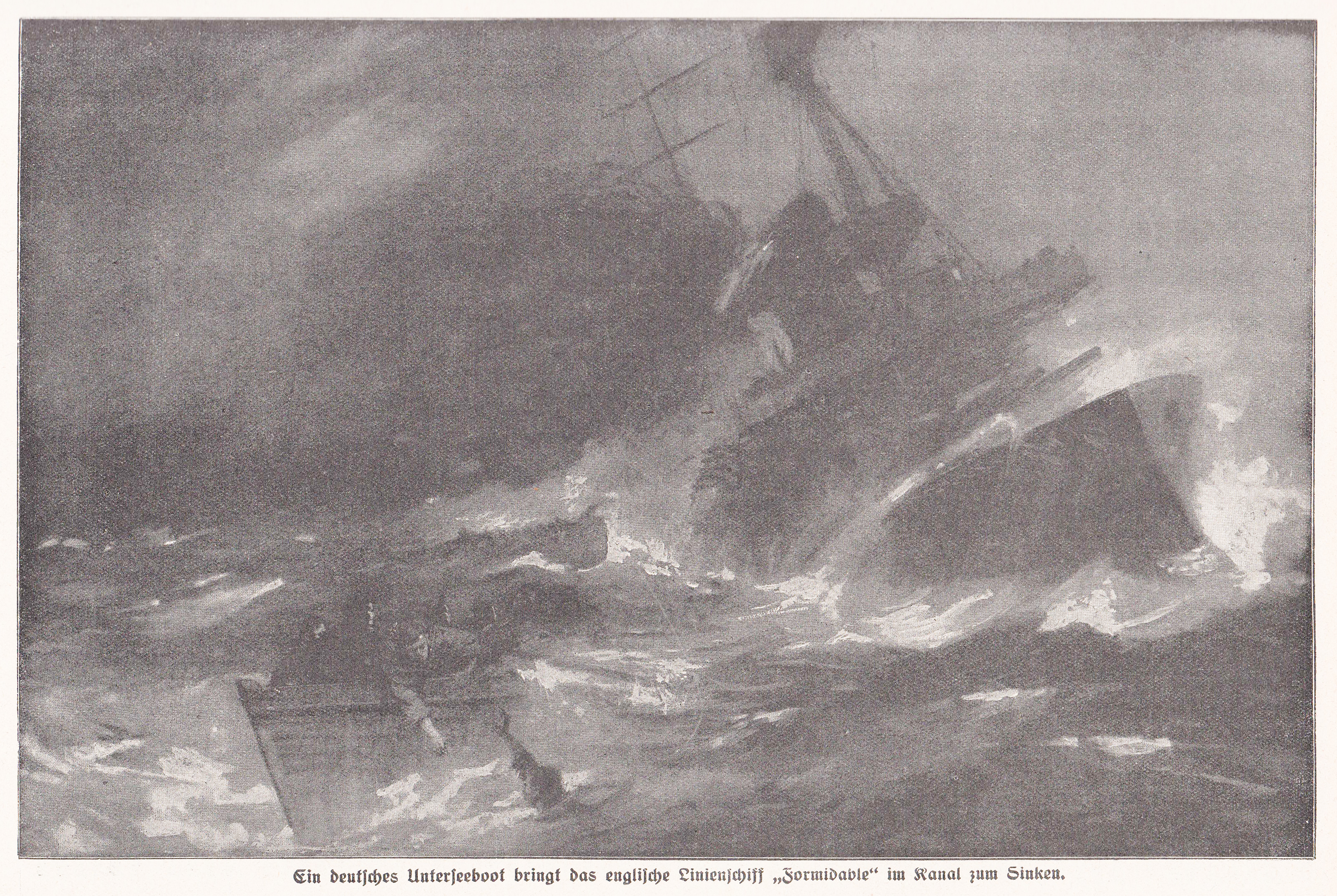
German depiction of HMS Formidable sinking

Under the command of Vice-Admiral Commanding, Channel Fleet, Sir Lewis Bayly, the 5th Battle Squadron spent 31 December participating in gunnery exercises off the Isle of Portland, supported by the light cruisers Topaze and Diamond. The squadron received no escort of destroyers for the operation. After the exercises, that night the fleet remained at sea on patrol even though submarine activity had been reported in the area. Visibility that night was good, though the sea was rough enough to make detection of a submarine difficult. Bayly suspected no danger from submarines, and so steamed his ships in line ahead formation at a speed of 10 knots (19 km/h; 12 mph). Formidable was the last battleship in the line, followed only by the two cruisers. Unknown to the British, the German submarine U-24 stalked the squadron while it was exercising all afternoon, trying to find a suitable attack position.

At around 02:20 on 1 January 1915, U-24 launched a torpedo at Formidable, striking her on the starboard side abreast of the forward funnel. Formidable's commander, Captain Loxley, hoped to save the ship by bringing her close to shore; the other British ships were at that point unaware of what had happened, but after Formidable turned out of line, Topaze increased speed to determine what she was doing. By the time Topaze closed with Formidable twenty minutes later, the latter vessel had already taken on a list of 20 degrees to starboard, and Loxley had issued the order to abandon ship. Men attempting to save the vessel remained aboard and through counter-flooding reduced the list, though Formidable was by then very low in the water.

At around 03:05, U-24 launched another torpedo at the stricken Formidable, hitting her again on the starboard side close to her bow. Topaze, joined by Diamond, began the rescue effort, but the heavy seas made it very difficult to bring men aboard. Formidable remained afloat for another hour and forty minutes, and at 04:45 began to capsize and sink by the bow. She remained afloat, with her stern in the air, for a few minutes before sinking. Loxley was last seen on the bridge calmly overseeing the evacuation of the ship. Diamond picked up thirty-seven officers and crew from the water. The Brixham trawler Provident picked up 73 members of Formidable's crew from the battleship's launch at around midday, while Formidable's pinnace managed to reach Lyme Regis after 22 hours at sea, saving another 47 men. A total of 35 officers and 512 men were killed in the sinking.

An inquiry from the Admiralty into the sinking determined that the risk of conducting training exercises in the Channel without destroyer protection was excessive and should not be continued. Bayly was relieved of command for failing to take adequate precautions against submarine attack.

== Wreck site ==
Formidable's wreck site is designated as a controlled site under the Protection of Military Remains Act 1986.
