= Charles Beresford (cricketer) =

New Zealand cricketer (1846–1906)

Personal information
- Full name: Charles Henry Beresford
- Born: 1846
- Died: 19 January 1906 (aged 59–60); Auckland, New Zealand
- Source: CricketArchive, 27 June 2016

Charles Beresford (1846 – 19 January 1906) was a New Zealand cricketer. He played one first-class match for Taranaki in 1882/83.

Beresford grew up in New South Wales and moved to New Zealand in the 1870s, where he established a business in Normanby, in the Taranaki district, before moving to the Auckland district. He died suddenly while playing cricket in Mangamuka.

== See also ==
- List of Taranaki representative cricketers
