= HMS Amethyst (1903) =

Topaze-class cruiser

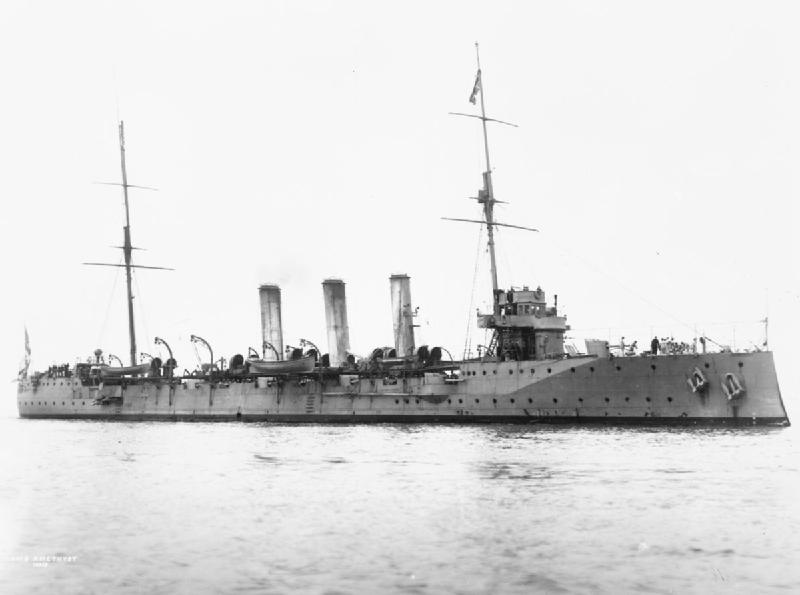

History

United Kingdom
- Name: HMS Amethyst
- Builder: Elswick Naval Works, Armstrong Whitworth & Co
- Yard number: 735
- Laid down: January 1903
- Launched: 5 November 1903
- Completed: 17 March 1905
- Fate: Sold for scrap 1 October 1920

General characteristics
- Class & type: Topaze-class protected cruiser
- Displacement: 3,000 tons
- Length: 360 ft (109.7 m)
- Beam: 40 ft (12.2 m)
- Draught: 14 ft 6 in (4.42 m)
- Installed power: 12,000 hp (8,900 kW)
- Propulsion: Parsons turbines; 3 shafts
- Speed: 22.5 knots (41.7 km/h)
- Complement: 296
- Armament: 12 × QF 4-inch guns; 8 × 3-pounder guns; 2 × 18-inch (450-mm) torpedo tubes
- Armour: 1-inch gun shields, ½-inch to 2-inch deck armour

HMS Amethyst was a third-class protected cruiser of the Topaze class of the Royal Navy. She was launched in 1903, served during World War I at the Dardanelles and Gallipoli, in the Mediterranean and the South Atlantic. She was sold for scrap in 1920.

== Construction ==
She was laid down in January 1903 at Armstrong, Elswick, was launched on 5 November 1903 and was completed in March 1905.

Until Amethyst was built, the largest warships fitted with steam turbines were destroyers. Their use in Amethyst reduced overall range at 10 knots by 1,500 nautical miles (2,780 km), but increased it by 1,000 nautical miles (1,900 km) at 20 knots, compared with her sister ships.

== World War I ==
=== Battle of Heligoland Bight ===
Once World War I broke out in 1914, HMS Amethyst was assigned to the Harwich force of the Royal Navy. She participated in the Battle of Heligoland Bight under the command of Commodore Reginald Tyrwhitt. Later that year she was transferred to the 1st Light Cruiser Squadron of the Royal Navy.

=== Dardanelles Campaign ===
==== Minesweeping operations ====
Amethyst took part in the covering operation for the minesweeping effort in the Dardanelles and during the action on 1 March and 4 March 1915 she exchanged fire with Turkish forts. On the evening of 4 March she took on board injured personnel of the landing party and discharged them the next day into Soudan and SS Braemar Castle. During the hours of darkness between 6 and 11 March she took part in operations in the Dardanelles against mines, and was frequently in action against field artillery, forts and searchlights. On 14 March at 04:10 she was hit by field artillery and lost 22 men killed. A further 38 men were wounded, of whom 4 later died. Amethyst retired to Tenedos for repairs. The Captain, Commander G. J. Todd, and Lieutenant James C. J. Soutter, Senior Lieutenant, were commended in the Naval Dispatch dated 17 March 1914 from Vice Admiral Carden.

==== Gallipoli Landings ====
On 24 April 1915 Amethyst and her sister-ship Sapphire embarked soldiers and landed them by trawler at Y beach on the northwest shore of the Gallipoli Peninsula in the early morning of 25 April. She supported the British troops ashore with gunfire until 27 April by bombarding enemy positions. By mid-morning on 27 April, with the situation on the beach described as "desperate", surviving troops were beginning to come back on board - Amethyst took on board over 250 officers and men, many of them wounded.

Over the following days, Amethyst continued to provide support to the operations on W, Y and Z beaches. On 3 May she lay off Z beach and reported heavy gunfire on shore and large calibre enemy shells landing in the proximity of the British ships. On the night of 5 May, troops were taken from Z beach for redeployment to X and Y beaches.

Amethyst's last part in the landings occurred on 18 May when she proceeded up the Gulf of Adramyt in the early hours, accompanied by destroyers, arriving at Asia Bay just after 05:00. She sent an armed party away in boats to investigate the possibility of removing enemy lighters, but they returned 20 minutes later reporting that a sandbar prevented them from being moved. Two enemy oil tanks were demolished by gunfire, and at 06:45 an enemy field gun battery opened fire. Amethyst replied, silencing the guns, but was hit with the loss of 1 rating killed and 4 wounded.

=== Mediterranean ===
After conducting patrols from Brindisi during June and July 1915, Amethyst went into dry dock for a refit from 28 July until 17 August. She returned to Brindisi on 15 September and was present there on 27 September when the Italian battleship Benedetto Brin exploded at the buoys in the outer harbour. Amethyst's boats assisted in rescuing the survivors.

For much of the autumn of 1915, Amethyst stayed in port and acted a temporary depot ship for British submarines passing through on patrol. On 19 November, Amethyst headed towards Malta and thence to Gibraltar, arriving on 27 November. On 1 December she set out for Portsmouth, and then on 11 December for Barrow-in-Furness where she moored up in Devonshire Dock. She remained there until 14 March 1916 when she headed south to Plymouth, then Bilbao and arriving in Gibraltar on 23 March.

=== South America ===
In 1916 Commander Edward Unwin took command. He had earned a Victoria Cross in the Gallipoli campaign. Amethyst was assigned to South America, and left Gibraltar on 8 May 1916.

On 23 November 1916, Commander, the Earl of Glasgow took over command whilst the ship was stationed at Viçosa Reef, off the coast of Brazil.

In December 1916 Amethyst, supported by two armed merchant cruisers, HMS Macedonia and HMS Orama, and two colliers, SS Minieh and SS Daleham, was ordered to search for the German commerce raider SMS Möwe. On 9 January Möwe sank the collier Minieh, and when she failed to rendezvous with the rest of the squadron, a search was begun. The squadron returned to the Port of Bahia without success. A further attempt to find Möwe was made on 24 January when Amethyst was joined by HMS Glasgow, but this was also unsuccessful. Patrols to search for German surface raiders were also conducted in April and May 1917.

After a long stay in Rio de Janeiro, Amethyst sailed on 5 April 1918, patrolling down the coast inspecting vessels and arriving in Montevideo on 10 March. On 31 May 1918 Amethyst left Bahia, Brazil to return to Devonport. On the way home, she met HMS Britannia off the coast of Sierra Leone and 295 cases of gold bullion (worth an estimated £1 million) were loaded on board. She arrived in Devonport on 25 June. On 1 July 1918 Amethyst left Devonport for Barrow-in-Furness, where she went into dry dock for the remainder of the war.

== Post World War I ==
Amethyst was recommissioned on 20 November 1918 and on the way to Gibraltar she stopped at Lisbon for the funeral of the late President of Portugal, Sidónio Pais on 21 December.

== Fate ==
She paid off for the last time on 10 February 1919 at Malta and was sold for scrap on 1 October 1920. In the November, under tow on her way to the breaker's at Milford Haven, the tow parted in a gale and heavy seas and the New Quay lifeboat took off seven of Amethyst's eight crew; the captain was taken off two days later in the continuing storm by Aberystwyth lifeboat.
