= Frank Bayly =

New Zealand cricketer

Personal information
- Born: 9 August 1860; New Plymouth, New Zealand
- Died: 23 November 1948 (aged 88); Auckland, New Zealand
- Source: ESPNcricinfo, 27 June 2016

Frank Bayly (9 August 1860 – 23 November 1948) was a New Zealand cricketer. He played one first-class match for Taranaki in 1882/83.

He was one of six brothers who represented Taranaki at cricket and rugby, including:

- Alfred Bayly (1866–1901), Taranaki cricket and rugby representative. New Zealand rugby representative and captain.
- George Bayly (1856–1938), Taranaki cricket and rugby representative. President of the Taranaki and New Zealand Rugby Union.
- Harry Bayly (1862–1935), Taranaki cricket representative.
- Walter Bayly (1869–1950), Taranaki and New Zealand rugby representative.

== See also ==
- List of Taranaki representative cricketers
