= John Cunningham (cricketer) =

New Zealand cricketer

Personal information
- Born: 18 November 1854; New Plymouth, New Zealand
- Died: 20 August 1932 (aged 77); Toorak, Victoria, Australia
- Source: ESPNcricinfo, 27 June 2016

John Cunningham (18 November 1854 – 20 August 1932) was a New Zealand cricketer. He played one first-class match for Taranaki in 1882/83.

== See also ==
- List of Taranaki representative cricketers
