= Henry Coutts =

New Zealand cricketer and soldier

Personal information
- Full name: Henry Donald Coutts
- Born: 14 November 1866; Canterbury, New Zealand
- Died: 30 April 1944 (aged 77); Auckland, New Zealand
- Source: ESPNcricinfo, 27 June 2016

Henry Coutts (14 November 1866 – 30 April 1944) was a New Zealand cricketer and soldier. He played three first-class matches for Taranaki between 1882 and 1892. During the Second Boer War he was one of only eight soldiers to be awarded the Queen's Scarf for bravery. He also served in the First World War.

== See also ==
- List of Taranaki representative cricketers
