= Matthew Goodson =

Matthew Goodson can refer to:

- Matthew Goodson (cricketer, born 1863) (1863–1919), a New Zealand cricketer
- Matthew Goodson (cricketer, born 1970) (born 1970), a New Zealand cricketer
