= Ernest Cole (cricketer) =

New Zealand cricketer

Personal information
- Full name: Ernest Colyer Cole
- Born: 20 March 1875; Nelson, New Zealand
- Died: 24 September 1965 (aged 90); Rotorua, New Zealand
- Source: ESPNcricinfo, 27 June 2016

Ernest Cole (20 March 1875 – 24 September 1965) was a New Zealand cricketer. He played one first-class match for Taranaki in 1896/97.

== See also ==
- List of Taranaki representative cricketers
