= Michael Foley (cricketer) =

New Zealand soldier, cricketer, hotel keeper and horse-racing administrator

Personal information
- Born: c. 1854; Auckland, New Zealand
- Died: 1 October 1922 (aged 68); Ponsonby, Auckland, New Zealand
- Source: ESPNcricinfo, 28 June 2016

Michael Foley (c. 1854 – 1 October 1922) was a New Zealand soldier, cricketer, hotel keeper and horse-racing administrator.

== Life and career ==
Born in Auckland in the mid-1850s, Foley served as a sergeant in the New Zealand Armed Constabulary in the 1870s and 1880s. He was one of the troops involved in capturing the Māori settlement of Parihaka in 1881. He received a special monetary award in 1886 for his part in the arrest of Te Whiti and others, and for "the suppression of disturbance".

While stationed in Opunake in the Taranaki region, Foley involved himself in sporting and theatrical activities in the area. Principally a batsman, but described as "a first-class all-round man", he played first-class cricket matches for Wellington in 1876 and Taranaki in 1883. His score of 17 was Taranaki's top score when they lost to Auckland in 1882–83. His first-innings score of 47 not out was the highest on either side when a New Plymouth team beat a visiting Auckland team in a non-first-class match earlier that season. He was also a prominent tennis player and sprinter.

Foley resigned from the Armed Constabulary in 1886 and took up the licence of the Prince of Wales Hotel in Wanganui. In June 1887 he provided the catering for the official reception during the Governor's visit to Wanganui. He then owned and ran a series of hotels in the Auckland area: the Avondale Hotel in Avondale in 1889, the Wairoa Hotel in Clevedon in 1895, the City Hotel and the Hobson Hotel, both in central Auckland, in 1898, and finally the Tuakau Hotel in Tuakau in the northern Waikato in 1910, which he later leased.

Foley was a founder of the Opunake Racing Club, and owned several horses that won there. When he moved to Auckland he was one of the founders in 1890 of the Avondale Jockey Club, of which he was president at the time of his death in 1922. He was also one of the founders and presidents of the Northern Boxing Association.

== Personal life ==
In April 1887 Foley married Emma Stone at her family home in Kai Iwi, near Wanganui. They had nine children. After a long illness he died in October 1922 at his home in Ardmore Road, in the Auckland suburb of Ponsonby, aged 68.
