= Matthew Goodson (cricketer, born 1863) =

New Zealand cricketer

Personal information
- Born: 16 April 1863; Whanganui, New Zealand
- Died: 3 June 1919 (aged 56); Whanganui, New Zealand
- Source: Cricinfo, 7 March 2017

Matthew Goodson (16 April 1863 – 3 June 1919) was a New Zealand cricketer. He played one first-class match for Taranaki in 1891/92.

== See also ==
- List of Taranaki representative cricketers
