= Bayly Park =

Park in Hāwera, Taranaki, New Zealand

Coordinates: 39°35′10.41″S 174°16′34.57″E

- Interactive map of Bayly Park

Ground information
- Location: Hāwera, New Zealand
- Country: New Zealand
- Establishment: 1892 (first recorded match)

Team information
Taranaki	(1892–1898)
- As of 3 November 2011; Source: Ground profile

Bayly Park was a cricket ground and recreational reserve in Hāwera, Taranaki, New Zealand.

Bayly Park was established in the 1890s beside Camberwell Road on land owned by a local sports identity, George Bayly, who wanted to provide sports facilities for Hāwera. He helped to develop it into the town's main sports venue, hosting cricket, football, tennis and cycling.

First-class cricket was first played on Bayly Park in 1892 when Taranaki played Hawke's Bay. A further first-class match came in 1895 when Taranaki played the touring Fijians, and another first-class fixture followed against Hawke's Bay in 1897. The final first-class match played there came in 1898 when Taranaki played Canterbury.

What was Bayly Park is now part of Hāwera High School, and functions as a part of the school's recreation areas.
