= Queen's Scarf =

The Queen's Scarf was awarded to British and colonial soldiers for bravery during the Second Boer War (1899–1902). Eight scarves were personally crocheted by Queen Victoria, with assistance from Princess Mary, Duchess of Cornwall, and presented to soldiers. Each was approximately 152 centimetres (five feet) long, 23 centimetres (nine inches) wide, made of khaki-coloured Berlin wool, and bore the Queen's royal cypher, VRI, at one end.

The Earl Roberts wrote on 1 March 1902 that "his Lordship desires to place on record that in April 1900, Her Late Majesty Queen Victoria was graciously pleased to send him four woollen scarves worked by herself, for distribution to the four most distinguished private soldiers in the Colonial Forces of Canada, Australia, New Zealand, and South Africa, then serving under his command. The selection for these gifts of honour was made by the officers commanding the contingents concerned, it being understood that gallant conduct in the field was to be considered the primary qualification".

== Status ==
There was some speculation that the award of the Queen's Scarf was equivalent to that of the Victoria Cross. The New Zealand government asked that the title be used in the Army List, but permission to do so was denied by the Secretary of State for War in 1902. The Illustrated London News in 1956 called it "the world's rarest award for valour". In 1956, a relative of one of the holders asked to attend the centenary celebrations for the VC, but was told that the scarf was not equal in status to the cross.

== Recipients ==
| Country | Name | Regiment | Note |
| United Kingdom | Colour Sergeant FF Ferrett DCM | Queen's Royal Regiment (West Surrey) | Battle of Colenso |
| United Kingdom | Colour Sergeant F Kingsley DCM | 2nd West Yorkshire Regiment | |
| United Kingdom | Colour Sergeant H Clay DCM | 2nd East Surrey Regiment | Wounded at Colenso and at Vaalkrantz |
| United Kingdom | Sergeant W Colclough | 2nd Devonshire Regiment | |
| Australia | Private A Du Frayer | New South Wales Mounted Infantry | Rescued a dismounted comrade under heavy fire on April 11, 1900 |
| Canada | Private RR Thompson | The Royal Canadian Regiment | Went to the aid of wounded comrades at Paardeberg on 18 and 27 February 1900 |
| New Zealand | Trooper Henry Coutts | 1st New Zealand Contingent | Rescued a wounded comrade caught in an ambush at Sanna's Post on 31 March 1900 |
| South Africa | Trooper Leonard Chadwick | Roberts' Horse | |
