= Harry Fannin =

Personal information
- Full name: Henry Albert Fannin
- Born: 25 September 1870; Napier, New Zealand
- Died: 20 January 1959 (aged 88); Hastings, New Zealand

Domestic team information
- Years: Team
- 1892-93 to 1899-1900: Hawke's Bay

Career statistics
| Competition | First-class |
|---|---|
| Matches | 11 |
| Runs scored | 116 |
| Batting average | 6.10 |
| 100s/50s | 0/0 |
| Top score | 25 |
| Balls bowled | 1637 |
| Wickets | 43 |
| Bowling average | 14.76 |
| 5 wickets in innings | 4 |
| 10 wickets in match | 2 |
| Best bowling | 8/19 |
| Catches/stumpings | 8/0 |
- Source: CricketArchive, 8 January 2017

Henry Albert Fannin (25 September 1870 – 20 January 1959) was a cricketer who played 11 matches of first-class cricket for Hawke's Bay between 1892 and 1899.

A fast bowler, Fannin had an outstanding season in 1897-98 when he took 22 wickets in two matches. Against Taranaki in December 1897 he took 8 for 49 (including a hat-trick) and 3 for 42 in an innings victory for Hawke's Bay. Nine of his victims were bowled. In Hawke's Bay's next match the following March, getting movement each way off the pitch, he took 8 for 19 (all bowled) and 3 for 35 against Auckland in a drawn match.

Fannin married Margaret Leithead in Woodville in June 1899. In July 1900 Fannin's employers, the New Zealand Loan and Mercantile Agency Company, transferred him from Napier to Feilding. In a tribute, the Hastings Standard called him "one of the most good-natured and unselfish fellows who ever slogged a boundary or knocked a stump out of the ground".
