= Percy Pratt =

Personal information
- Full name: Percy Mackenzie Pratt
- Born: 12 January 1874; Bareilly, British India
- Died: 20 July 1961 (aged 87); Denmark, Western Australia

Domestic team information
- Years: Team
- 1894–95 to 1897–98: Taranaki

Career statistics
| Competition | First-class |
|---|---|
| Matches | 5 |
| Runs scored | 227 |
| Batting average | 32.42 |
| 100s/50s | 0/1 |
| Top score | 85 |
| Balls bowled | 138 |
| Wickets | 2 |
| Bowling average | 44.50 |
| 5 wickets in innings | 0 |
| 10 wickets in match | 0 |
| Best bowling | 2/26 |
| Catches/stumpings | 0/0 |
- Source: Cricinfo, 8 January 2017

Percy Mackenzie Pratt (12 January 1874 – 20 July 1961) was a cricketer who played five matches of first-class cricket for Taranaki from 1895 to 1898.

Pratt's highest score was 85, in Taranaki's only first-class victory, against Hawke's Bay in March 1897. He and William Crawshaw (106) added 114 for the third wicket. He scored his runs "very rapidly" and hit 13 fours.

Pratt continued to represent the region after Taranaki lost first-class status after the 1897–98 season. Against the Australians in 1909–10 he top-scored for Taranaki with 31 in a match that ended in a close draw. Four years later he opened for South Taranaki against the Australians and scored 89; the next-highest Taranaki scorer made 33. He represented South Taranaki in the Hawke Cup from 1911 to 1922.

Pratt ran a cabinet-making, upholstering and undertaking business in Hāwera. He married Beatrice Annie King in Hawera in February 1902. He and his family went to live in Norfolk Island in 1928. Later they moved to Western Australia, where they had a property beside the Hay River near Denmark.
