= Charles Clark (Auckland cricketer) =

New Zealand cricketer

Personal information
- Full name: Charles Croom Clark
- Born: 13 July 1883; Auckland, New Zealand
- Died: 6 August 1970 (aged 87); Thames, New Zealand

Domestic team information
- Years: Team
- 1913/14: Auckland

Career statistics
Competition	First-class
Matches	3
Runs scored	60
Batting average	15.00
100s/50s	0/0
Top score	15*
Balls bowled	422
Wickets	11
Bowling average	30.90
5 wickets in innings	1
10 wickets in match	0
Best bowling	5/108
Catches/stumpings	1/–
- Source: ESPNcricinfo, 31 July 2020

Charles Groom Clark (13 July 1883 – 6 August 1970) was a New Zealand cricketer. He played three first-class matches for Auckland in 1913/14.

An opening bowler, Clark took 5 for 108 in the second innings of his first first-class match in January 1914. He continued playing senior cricket well into his forties. In December 1926 he opened the bowling and took 7 for 16 and 6 for 110 as Taranaki defeated Wanganui to win the Hawke Cup for the first time. In February 1930, at the age of 46, he took 3 for 100 when Taranaki lost to the touring MCC.

Clark worked as a carpenter. He served overseas in World War I with the 1st New Zealand Cyclist Company of the New Zealand Expeditionary Force.

== See also ==
- List of Auckland representative cricketers
