= Tom Southall =

New Zealand cricketer (1877–1949)

Personal information
- Full name: Thomas Richard Southall
- Born: 27 November 1877; Wollaston, Worcestershire, England
- Died: 28 April 1949 (aged 71); Karori, Wellington, New Zealand
- Height: 6 ft 4 1/2 in (1.94 m)
- Bowling: Slow left-arm orthodox

Domestic team information
- Years: Team
- 1912-13 to 1914-15: Wellington

Career statistics
Competition	First-class
Matches	7
Runs scored	28
Batting average	3.50
100s/50s	0/0
Top score	6 not out
Balls bowled	930
Wickets	24
Bowling average	21.20
5 wickets in innings	3
10 wickets in match	0
Best bowling	7/32
Catches/stumpings	3/0
- Source: Cricinfo, 1 February 2015

Thomas Richard Southall (27 November 1877 – 28 April 1949) was an English-born New Zealand cricketer who played first-class cricket for Wellington from 1913 to 1915.

== Early career ==
The youngest of seven children in Wollaston, Worcestershire, Tom Southall was born to Thomas Richard Southall, Sr. and his wife, Mary, both of Stourbridge. He became a merchant marine officer and went to New Zealand in 1898. He moved from Christchurch to New Plymouth early in 1908 to work for the Roads and Bridges Department.

In September 1908, Southall was appointed inaugural captain of the United Service club in the North Taranaki Cricket Association. In the 1908-09 season of Saturday afternoon cricket he took 123 wickets for 467 runs, at an average of 3.79.

A left-arm spinner, six feet four and a half inches tall, "with a peculiar twist in his delivery", Southall usually opened the bowling. In his first match representing his region, for North Taranaki against Manawatu in 1909-10, he took 6 for 46 and 5 for 20 in North Taranaki's victory. Later that season, in a two-day match between a Taranaki 15 and the touring Australians, Southall, bowling unchanged throughout, took 6 for 78 and 5 for 49, bowling nine of his 11 victims, including several Test players. Chasing 156 for victory, the Australians were 138 for eight, with "Southall sending down deadly deceptive breaks like a book", when the Australian batsmen appealed against the light and play was called off.

In 1909 government retrenchments forced Southall out of the civil service and he began work as a sharebroker in New Plymouth. The business was not successful, and he faced bankruptcy proceedings in December 1910 and January 1911 with debts of around £500.

Southall moved to Wellington in 1912, working in newspaper marketing. He was immediately successful for the Wellington North club, who won the championship in 1912-13, when Southall set a Wellington Cricket Association record by taking 69 wickets, at an average of 10.40. He took five wickets for Wellington against the visiting South Melbourne in December 1912. Harry Trott, the South Melbourne captain, noting that there had been some questioning of the fairness of Southall's bowling action, wrote: "He certainly pushes the ball as it leaves his hand, but it is not a throw, and, in my opinion, perfectly fair."

== First-class career ==
Aged 35, Southall made his first-class debut on New Year's Day 1913 for Wellington against Auckland. He took 5 for 61 in the first innings, but Auckland won by nine wickets. In his first innings, batting in his customary position at number 11, he was bowled first ball by Caleb Olliff, who thus completed the innings with a hat-trick.

Southall was unavailable for Wellington's early matches in the 1913-14 season, but returned for the match against the Australians in February. Again he took five wickets in the first innings, dismissing Victor Trumper and Warwick Armstrong for ducks in successive balls and finishing with 5 for 34. The Australians were dismissed for 124 in reply to Wellington's 201, but went on to win the match.

At the end of the season, in a first-class match between Wellington and a Canterbury team led by Dan Reese, Southall took 7 for 32 in the first innings, dismissing Reese's XI for 97. In club cricket in 1913-14 Southall took 42 wickets at 9.30 for Wellington North, who tied for the championship.

He was unable to maintain his previous form in the three matches he played for Wellington in 1914-15, when he took six wickets at 46.83. In club cricket he took 42 wickets at 20.11, and Wellington North finished second.

== Later career ==
Southall served in the Otago Infantry Regiment in the First World War. He moved to Masterton in 1919, where he worked as Repatriation Officer for the Masterton Repatriation Board. In his first match for the Carlton club in the Wairarapa Cricket Association he took 6 for 12 and 5 for 9. He took 2 for 20 and 4 for 26 for Wairarapa when they beat Poverty Bay to win the Hawke Cup in February 1921. He took six wickets when Wairarapa retained the Cup against Manawatu in early December 1921, and four wickets when they lost it to Rangitikei three weeks later.

Southall sued his first wife for divorce in 1920 and married Lily Anne O'Dowd in Masterton in July 1921. He became secretary of Masterton Racing Club in August 1922. In August 1923 he pleaded guilty to charges of forgery and theft arising from his period as a Repatriation Officer. The "total defalcations amounted to £483", of which at the time of his trial he had paid back more than half. He was "ordered to be detained for reformative purposes for twelve months". He was released in July 1924.

In 1927-28 Southall opened the bowling and took 6 for 86 for Southern Hawke's Bay in their innings loss to Manawatu in the Hawke Cup.

Southall died in April 1949 and his wife Lily died in February 1954.
