= John Bayly (priest, died 1633) =

John Bayly (died 1633), was the second son of Bishop Lewis Bayly, and at the age of sixteen went to Exeter College, Oxford, of which society he was elected fellow in 1612. In 1617 he obtained holy orders from his father, and quickly received various benefices in Wales. He ultimately became guardian of Christ's Hospital, Ruthin, and chaplain to Charles I.

He published two sermons at Oxford in 1630, bearing the titles of the 'Angell Guardian,’ and 'Life Everlasting.' He died in 1633.
