= Topaze-class cruiser =

1905 class of British protected cruisers

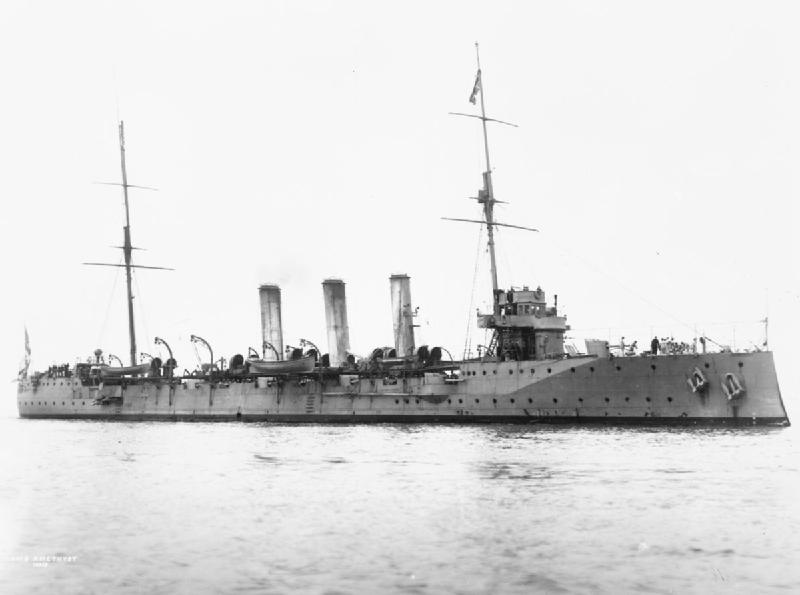
- HMS Amethyst

Class overview
- Operators: Royal Navy
- Preceded by: Pelorus class
- Succeeded by: Town-class (1910) light cruiser
- Subclasses: Amethyst
- Built: 1903–1905
- In commission: 1905–1921
- Planned: 8
- Completed: 4
- Cancelled: 4
- Scrapped: 4

General characteristics
- Class & type: Topaze-class protected cruiser
- Displacement: 3,000 long tons (3,000 t)
- Length: 360 ft (109.7 m) (p/p)
- Beam: 40 ft (12.2 m)
- Draught: 16 ft (4.9 m)
- Installed power: 10 water-tube boilers; 9,800–12,000 ihp (7,300–8,900 kW)
- Propulsion: All except Amethyst: 2 shafts, 2 triple-expansion steam engines; Amethyst: 3 shafts, steam turbine set
- Speed: 21–22 knots (39–41 km/h; 24–25 mph)
- Complement: 318
- Armament: 12 × 4 in (102 mm) guns; 8 × 3 pdr (47 mm (1.9 in)) guns; 2 × 18 in (450 mm) torpedo tubes
- Armour: Deck: 0.75–2 in (19.1–50.8 mm); Gun shields: 1 in (25 mm); Conning tower: 3 in (76 mm)

The Topaze-class cruisers (often referred to as the Gem class) were a quartet of third-class protected cruisers built for the Royal Navy in the first decade of the 20th century (four additional ships of the class were cancelled before their keels were laid).

As significant historical first, HMS Amethyst of this class was the first warship larger than a destroyer to be powered by turbine engines.

This class also embodied many historical lasts. Despite being units of the Edwardian-period Royal Navy, they represented the end of the Victorian-period lineage of protected cruisers in many ways. Amongst the many cruiser classes of the Royal Navy to have been rated as protected cruisers these were the last to be officially classified as such. They were the last British cruisers to feature the traditional arrangement of raised forecastle and poop connected by amidships bulwarks. They were also the last to be designed for propulsion by reciprocating steam engines, except for the aforementioned HMS Amethyst.

Perhaps most significantly of all, the Gems were the very last third-class protected cruisers to be so rated in the Royal Navy. The classes which followed were of similar type, and like the protected cruisers featured internal protective decks instead of armour belts, but were faster though weaker, and intended for a very specialised role, thus according them the new official type designation scout cruiser. When the later small turbine-propelled cruisers of the Arethusa class appeared (combining the features of scouts & second-class cruisers, to provide for greater utility & fighting power more in line with the Third Class), the new ships were designated from the outset as light armoured cruisers, thus dispensing with the third-class rating entirely.

== Design and description ==
Discussions had been ongoing for several years about a successor to the previous Pelorus class before the Admiralty decided on a design in 1901 that was very much larger and faster than the older ships. This represented a shift away from the traditional role of the third-class cruiser: previously best-suited to Imperial defence duties on foreign stations, but now shifting closer to the German concept of a light cruiser; a fast & potent small combatant, suitable for use with the Fleet for scouting duties in the presence of an enemy fleet. In this regard, the Topaze class demonstrates the effect of heightening tensions between the British and Germans, as the Royal Navy's procurement programmes began to emphasise potential combat in the North Sea in anticipation of a possible future war.

The first small cruisers designed for the Royal Navy by the new DNC Sir Philip Watts, the Topaze-class ships had a distinctive three-funneled appearance, with a length between perpendiculars of 360 feet (109.7 m), a beam of 40 feet (12.2 m) and a draught of 16 feet (4.9 m). They displaced 3,000 long tons (3,048 t) and their crew consisted of 313 officers and other ranks.

One objective for the Admiralty with these ships was to evaluate steam turbines against traditional triple-expansion steam engines in a ship larger than a destroyer and Amethyst became the first cruiser to be equipped with them. Her three sisters used a pair of 4-cylinder triple-expansion steam engines, each driving one shaft, using steam provided by 10 water-tube boilers. The engines were designed to produce a total of 9,800 indicated horsepower (7,300 kW) which was intended to give a maximum speed of 21.75 knots (40.28 km/h; 25.03 mph). The three ships easily exceeded their designed power and speeds during their sea trials. They carried a maximum of 700 long tons (710 t) of coal which gave them a range of 7,000 nautical miles (13,000 km; 8,100 mi) at 10 knots (19 km/h; 12 mph) and 2,000 nautical miles (3,700 km; 2,300 mi) at 20 knots (37 km/h; 23 mph).

Amethyst was fitted with a Parsons steam turbine set that drove three shafts using the same number of boilers as her sisters. They delivered enough steam to allow the engines to reach 12,000 ihp (8,900 kW) and her designed speed of 22.5 knots (41.7 km/h; 25.9 mph). She also easily exceeded her designed power and speeds during her sea trials, reaching 23.4 knots (43.3 km/h; 26.9 mph) from 14,300 ihp (10,700 kW). The turbine proved to be more economical at high speeds than the reciprocating engines of her sisters, but less so at slow speeds, only having an endurance of 5,500 nautical miles (10,200 km; 6,300 mi) at 10 knots, but 3,000 nautical miles (5,600 km; 3,500 mi) at 20 knots.

The main armament of the Topaze class consisted of a dozen quick-firing (QF) 4-inch (102 mm) guns. One gun each was mounted on the forecastle and the poop. The remaining ten guns were placed port and starboard amidships, with the forward and aftermost pairs of waist guns being sponsoned and the sides of the forecastle and poop embrasured to allow for axial fire from these four guns. This gave the ships a broadside of seven guns, with at least two guns able to fire through the extreme bow and quarter arcs, or three guns firing dead ahead and dead astern in a chase. Their 31-pound (14 kg) shells were fired at a muzzle velocity of 2,335 feet per second (712 m/s). The ships also carried eight QF 3-pounder Hotchkiss guns and two above water 18-inch (450 mm) torpedo tubes. The ships' protective deck armour ranged in thickness from .75 to 2 inches (19 to 51 mm), being at its thickest on the slopes amidships. The main guns were fitted with 1-inch (25 mm) gun shields and the conning tower had armour 3 inches (76 mm) thick.

== Ships ==
Name	Builder	Laid Down	Launched	Commissioned	Cost	Fate
Amethyst	Armstrong Whitworth, Elswick	7 January 1903	5 November 1903	17 March 1905	£228,426	Sold for scrap on 1 October 1920
Diamond	Laird, Birkenhead	24 March 1903	6 January 1904	January 1905	£231,010	Sold for scrap 9 May 1921
Sapphire	Palmers, Jarrow	30 March 1903	17 March 1904	7 February 1905	£226,227	Sold for scrap 9 May 1921
Topaze	Laird, Birkenhead	14 August 1902	23 July 1903	November 1904	£242,444	Sold for scrap 22 September 1921

== Bibliography ==
- Corbett, Julian. Naval Operations to the Battle of the Falklands. History of the Great War: Based on Official Documents. Vol. I (2nd ed.). Imperial War Museum in association with the Battery Press. ISBN 0-89839-256-X.
- Friedman, Norman (2012). British Cruisers of the Victorian Era. Seaforth. ISBN 978-1-59114-068-9.
- Friedman, Norman (2011). Naval Weapons of World War One: Guns, Torpedoes, Mines and ASW Weapons of All Nations; An Illustrated Directory. Seaforth Publishing. ISBN 978-1-84832-100-7.
- Preston, Antony (1985). "Great Britain and Empire Forces". In Gray, Randal (ed.). Conway's All the World's Fighting Ships 1906–1921. Naval Institute Press. pp. 1–104. ISBN 0-85177-245-5.
- Roberts, John (1979). "Great Britain (including Empire Forces)". In Chesneau, Roger & Kolesnik, Eugene M. (eds.). Conway's All the World's Fighting Ships 1860–1905. Mayflower Books. pp. 1–113. ISBN 0-8317-0302-4.
- Viscount Hythe (1912). The Naval Annual 1912. J Griffin and Co.
