= HMS Diamond (1904) =

Topaze-class cruiser

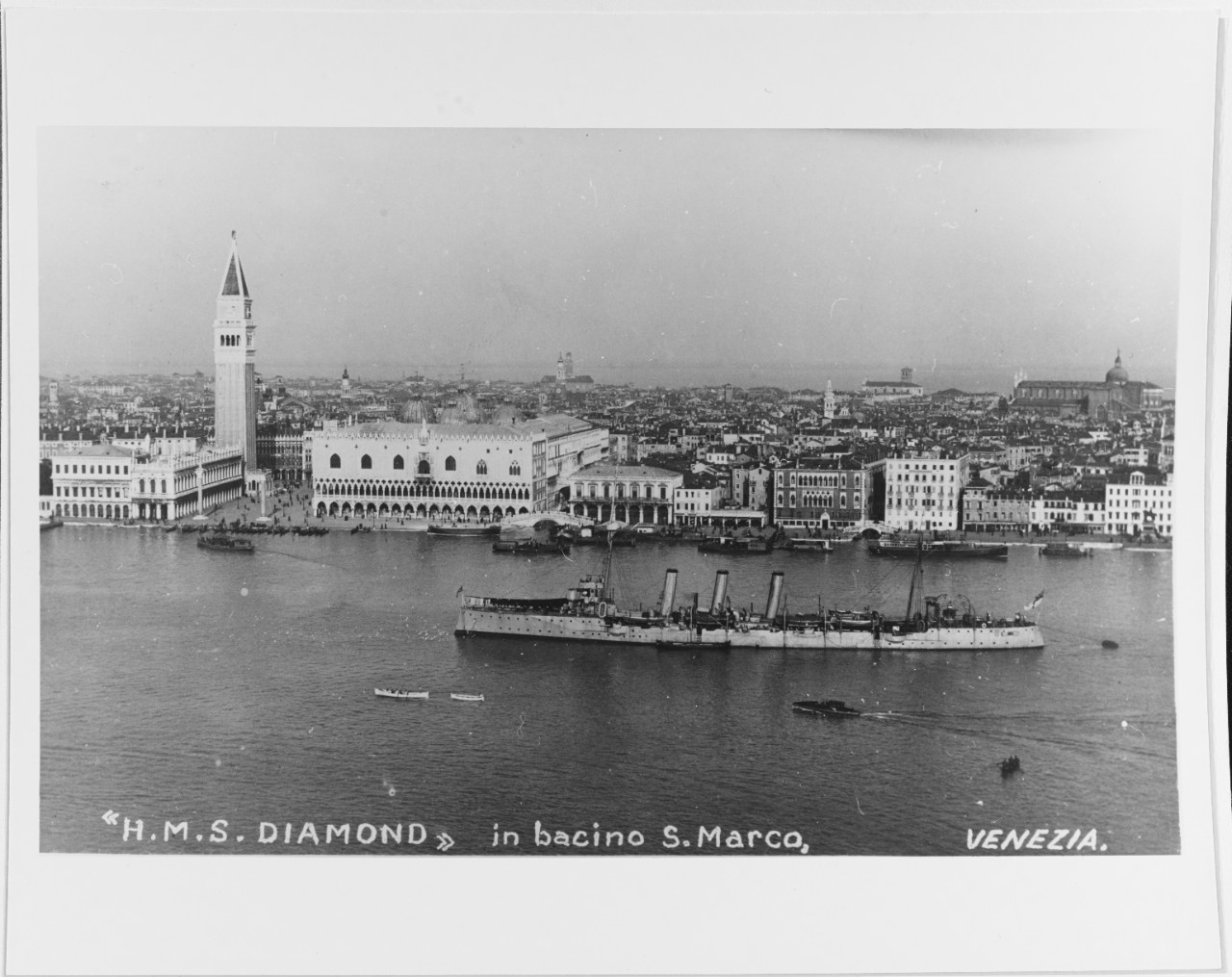
- HMS Diamond in Venice, c. 1919

History

United Kingdom
- Name: HMS Diamond
- Namesake: Diamond
- Builder: Cammell Laird, Birkenhead
- Launched: 6 January 1904
- Stricken: 9 May 1921
- Fate: Scrapped, 9 May 1921

General characteristics (as built)
- Type: Topaze-class cruiser
- Displacement: 3,000 long tons (3,000 t)
- Length: 379 ft 9 in (115.7 m)
- Beam: 40 ft (12.2 m)
- Draught: 14 ft 6 in (4.4 m)
- Speed: 21.75 knots (40.28 km/h; 25.03 mph)
- Crew: 296
- Armament: 12× QF 4-inch guns; 8× QF 3-pounder (47 mm) guns; 2× 18-inch (450 mm) torpedo tubes

HMS Diamond was a Topaze-class protected cruiser of the Royal Navy. She was launched on 6 January 1904, at Birkenhead, and was commissioned in January 1905. Diamond was decommissioned and sold for scrap on 9 May 1921.

== Design and description ==
HMS Diamond had a length of 379 ft 9 in (116 m), a beam of 40 ft (12 m), a draught of 14 ft 6 in (4.4 m), a displacement of 3,000 tonnes, and a top speed of 21.75 knots (40.28 km/h; 25.03 mph). Diamond had a crew numbering 296 servicemen.

== Construction and career ==
HMS Diamond was laid down in March 1903, and was built at Birkenhead, England, along with HMS Topaze. She was launched on 6 January 1904, however it would not be until January 1905 when she was fully completed, being commissioned later that month. In the years 1911 and 1912, she served with the 3rd Flotilla, operating as a senior officers ship. When World War I broke out in 1914, Diamond was assigned to the 5th Battle Squadron, where she would serve as an escort ship for the battleship HMS Lord Nelson. In 1915 she was reassigned to the 3rd Battle Squadron of the Grand Fleet, and in 1918 she was reassigned to the Mediterranean Fleet, serving the role of a Coastal Motor Boat carrier. Diamond remained as part of the Mediterranean Fleet until 1921, when she was recalled to England, where she was decommissioned and sold for scrap on 9 May 1921.
