= Alfred Bayly =

New Zealand rugby union player & cricketer

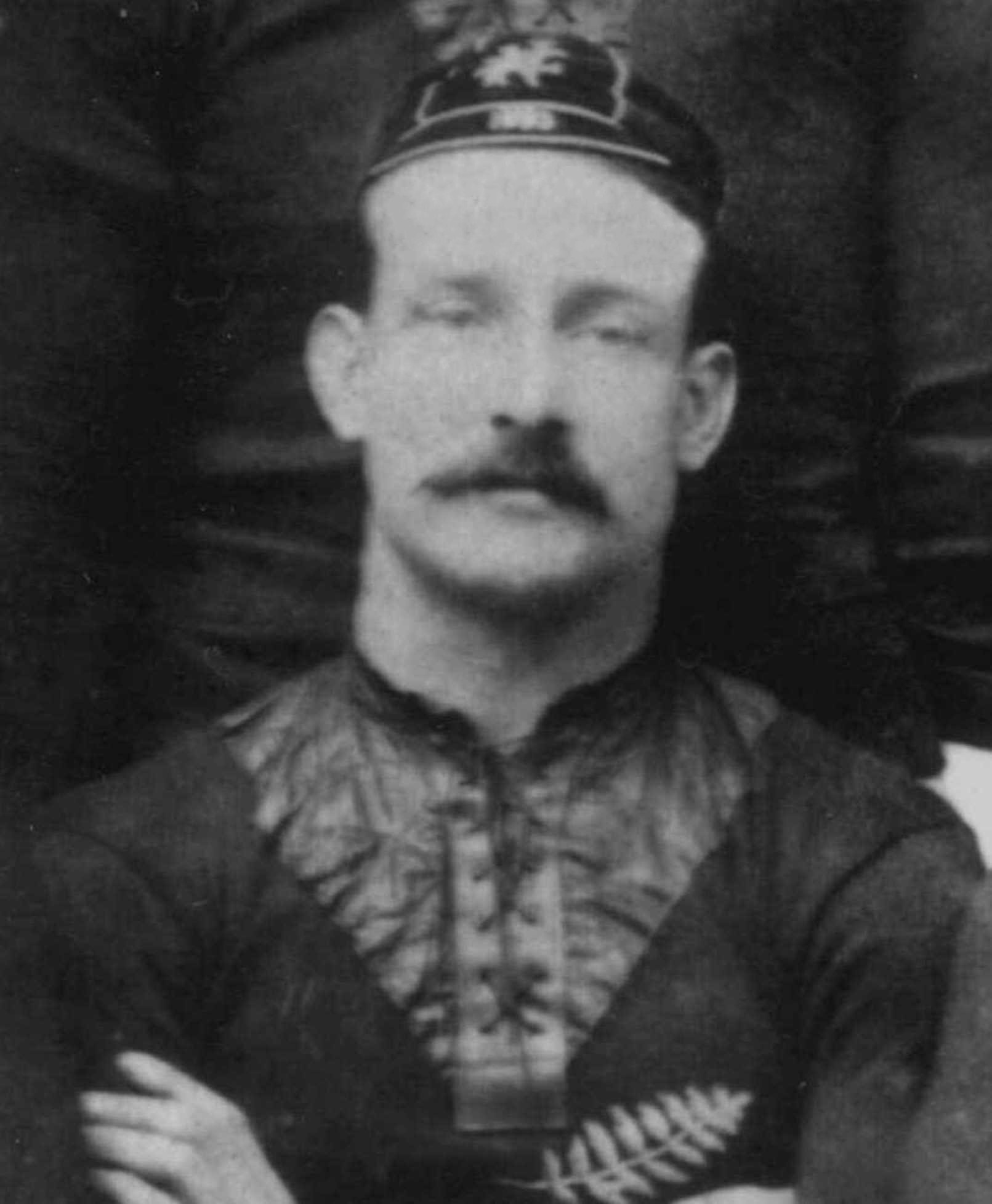
- Born: 20 May 1866 Waitara, New Zealand
- Died: 14 December 1907 (aged 41) Whanganui, New Zealand
- Weight: 83 kg (183 lb)
- School: New Plymouth Boys' High School
- Notable relative(s): Frank Bayly (brother); George Bayly (brother); Harry Bayly (brother); Walter Bayly (brother)
- Occupation: Farmer

Rugby union career
- Position: Utility back
Provincial / State sides
Years	Team	Apps	(Points)
1883–1901	Taranaki		
International career
Years	Team	Apps	(Points)
1893–97	New Zealand	0	(0)
- Cricket career

Cricket information

Domestic team information
- Years: Team
- 1891/92–1897/98: Taranaki

Career statistics
Competition	First-class
Matches	6
Runs scored	39
Batting average	6.50
100s/50s	0/0
Top score	20*
Balls bowled	474
Wickets	9
Bowling average	22.77
5 wickets in innings	1
10 wickets in match	0
Best bowling	6-54
Catches/stumpings	0/0
- Source: Cricinfo, 29 April 2017

Alfred Bayly (20 May 1866 – 14 December 1907) was a New Zealand rugby union player and administrator, and cricketer.

== Early life and family ==
Born in Waitara on 20 May 1866, Bayly was the son of Thomas Bayly and Ann Bayly (née Rundle).

He was one of six brothers who represented Taranaki at cricket and rugby, including:

- Frank Bayly (1860–1948), Taranaki cricket and rugby representative.
- George Bayly (1856-1938), Taranaki cricket and rugby representative. President of the Taranaki and New Zealand Rugby Union.
- Harry Bayly (1862–1935), Taranaki cricket representative.
- Walter Bayly (1869–1950), Taranaki and New Zealand rugby representative.

Alfred Bayly was educated at New Plymouth Boys' High School. He married Mary Eleanor Georgina Cashel on 30 September 1895, at St Paul's Church, Auckland, and they went on to have five daughters, three of whom died as children.

== Rugby union ==
A utility back, Bayly made his first-class debut as a 16-year-old, appearing for West Coast (North Island) against the touring New South Wales team in 1882. He played his first match for Taranaki the following year, and played for the province until the 1901 season.

Bayly was a member of the New Zealand team that toured Australia in 1893. On that tour he played in all 10 matches, scoring three tries. In 1894, he captained New Zealand in their 6–8 loss to the touring New South Wales team at Lancaster Park, Christchurch. After missing selection for national side in 1896, Bayly was recalled in 1897 to captain the team on their tour of Australia, making nine appearances. In all, Bayly played 20 games for New Zealand, including 10 as captain, scoring six tries and one drop goal for a total of 20 points. He did not play any Test matches, as New Zealand did not play its first full international match until 1903.

In 1899, Barney Armit was fatally injured during a provincial match between Otago and Taranaki. Armit attempted to hurdle Bayly, but Bayly rose up and caught him around the ankles; Armit was subsequently up-ended and seriously injured his spine in the fall. Armit died 11 weeks later and became the first New Zealand international to die from injuries sustained on the rugby field. According to his obituary, Bayly was extremely distraught by the incident and "wept like a child" on Armit's death—it may have even shortened his life.

Bayly served as a Taranaki selector from 1891 to 1898, in 1901, and in 1906, and was a national selector in 1901 and 1905. He was president of the Taranaki Rugby Football Union between 1899 and 1906, and president of the New Zealand Rugby Football Union in 1907, dying in office.

== Cricket ==
He played six first-class matches for Taranaki between the 1891/92 and 1897/98 seasons. Over his first-class career he scored 39 runs, at an average of 6.50 and a high score of 20 not out. He took nine wickets at an average of 22.77, with best bowling figures of 6 for 54.

== Later life and death ==
A farmer at Toko, Bayly sold his property to the government in about 1905 and moved to Stratford. Owing to ill health, he moved to Whanganui in 1907, and died there on 14 December 1907. He was buried at Stratford Pioneer Cemetery.

== See also ==
- List of Taranaki representative cricketers
