= Charles Ellis Bayly =

English cricketer

Charles Ellis Bayly (christened 5 March 1797) was an English cricketer who played in one match for Sussex in 1825.

Bayly played for Sussex against Hampshire at Bramshill Park on 15 and 16 August 1825. He made scores of 2 and 1 not out in the match, which Hampshire won by 72 runs.

Bayly is only recorded on this one occasion and it is not known if he played regularly in earlier and later seasons. Players were rarely mentioned by name in contemporary reports and there are no other known references to Bayly.

== Bibliography ==
- Haygarth, Arthur (1996) [1862]. Scores & Biographies, Volume 1 (1744–1826). Kennington: Frederick Lillywhite. ISBN 978-19-00592-23-9.
- Haygarth, Arthur (1997) [1862]. Scores & Biographies, Volume 2 (1827–1840). Kennington: Frederick Lillywhite. ISBN 978-19-00592-23-9.
