= Bernard McCarthy =

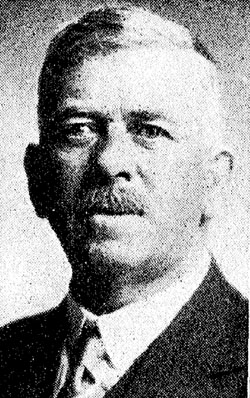
- McCarthy in 1935

Personal information
- Born: 24 July 1874; Charleston, Nelson Province, New Zealand
- Died: 7 July 1948 (aged 73); Hāwera, New Zealand
- Batting: Left-handed
- Bowling: Right-arm off-spin

Domestic team information
- Years: Team
- 1894/95–1897/98: Taranaki

Career statistics
Competition	First-class
Matches	6
Runs scored	139
Batting average	17.37
100s/50s	0/1
Top score	52
Balls bowled	919
Wickets	20
Bowling average	22.90
5 wickets in innings	1
10 wickets in match	0
Best bowling	5/109
Catches/stumpings	2/–
- Source: ESPNCricinfo, 1 June 2015

Bernard McCarthy (24 July 1874 – 7 July 1948) was a New Zealand cricketer, lawyer and papal knight.

== Life and work ==
After attending St. Patrick's College, Wellington, McCarthy moved to Hāwera, where he qualified as a lawyer and in 1903 founded the law firm that is now known as Welsh McCarthy. McCarthy Street in Hāwera is named after him. He became president of the St. Patrick's College Old Boys' Association; for his work for the Old Boys and for organising the school's golden jubilee celebrations in 1935 he was awarded the papal knighthood of St Gregory the Great.

== Cricket career ==
McCarthy played four matches for Taranaki during its brief period as a first-class cricket team. In Taranaki's only first-class victory, against Hawke's Bay in 1896–97, he took 3 for 42 and 4 for 46 with his off-spin. Hawke's Bay reversed the result in their next encounter in 1897–98, although McCarthy took his best figures of 5 for 109 and top-scored in each innings with 27 and 52, his best first-class score. He batted left-handed.

Although Taranaki played no first-class matches after 1898, and McCarthy's cricket for four years was limited to minor matches, he was selected to play for New Zealand in two matches against Lord Hawke's XI in 1902–03. He took three wickets, all of opening batsmen.

In the second match of the first season of the Hawke Cup in 1910–11, McCarthy took 6 for 12 and 4 for 29 as South Taranaki beat North Taranaki. He played his last Hawke Cup game in 1922–23.
