= HMS Sapphire (1904) =

Topaze-class cruiser

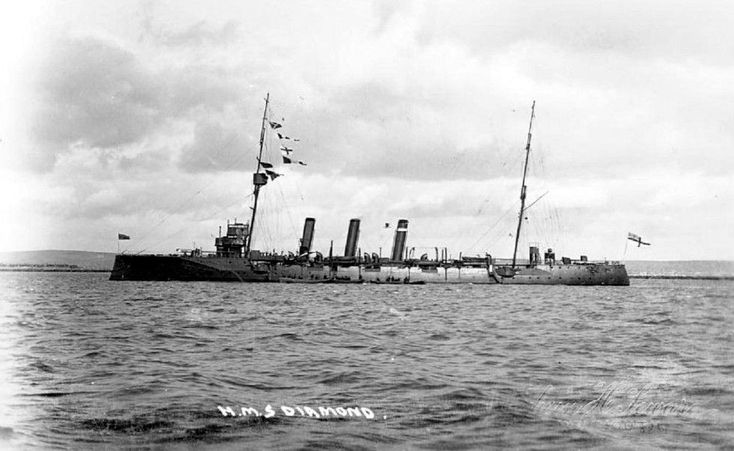
- Sapphire's sister ship, Diamond at anchor

History

United Kingdom
- Name: HMS Sapphire
- Namesake: Sapphire
- Builder: Palmers, Jarrow
- Laid down: January 1903
- Launched: 17 March 1904
- Completed: February 1905
- Fate: Sold for scrap, 9 May 1921

General characteristics
- Class & type: Topaze-class protected cruiser
- Displacement: 3,000 long tons (3,000 t)
- Length: 360 ft (109.7 m) (p/p)
- Beam: 40 ft (12.2 m)
- Draught: 16 ft (4.9 m)
- Installed power: 9,800 ihp (7,300 kW); 10 water-tube boilers
- Propulsion: 2 Shafts, 2 triple-expansion steam engines
- Speed: 21 knots (39 km/h; 24 mph)
- Range: 7,000 nautical miles (13,000 km; 8,100 mi) at 10 knots (19 km/h; 12 mph)
- Complement: 318
- Armament: 12 × QF 4-inch (102 mm) guns; 8 × QF 3-pounder (47-mm) guns; 2 × 18-inch (450 mm) torpedo tubes
- Armour: Deck: 0.75–2 in (19.1–50.8 mm); Gun shields: 1 in (25 mm); Conning tower: 3 in (76 mm)

HMS Sapphire was a Topaze-class protected cruiser built for the Royal Navy in the first decade of the 20th century. She saw active service in World War I and was sold for scrap in 1921.

== Design and description ==
Rated as third-class cruisers, the Topaze-class ships had a length between perpendiculars of 360 feet (109.7 m), a beam of 40 feet (12.2 m) and a draught of 16 feet (4.9 m). They displaced 3,000 long tons (3,000 t) and their crew consisted of 313 officers and other ranks.

Sapphire was fitted with a pair of four-cylinder vertical triple-expansion steam engines, each driving one shaft, using steam provided by 10 water-tube boilers. The engines were designed to produce a total of 9,800 indicated horsepower (7,300 kW) which was intended to give a maximum speed of 21.75 knots (40.28 km/h; 25.03 mph). They carried a maximum of 700 long tons (710 t) of coal which gave them a range of 7,000 nautical miles (13,000 km; 8,100 mi) at 10 knots (19 km/h; 12 mph) and 2,000 nautical miles (3,700 km; 2,300 mi) at 20 knots (37 km/h; 23 mph).

The main armament of the Topaze class consisted of a dozen quick-firing (QF) 4-inch (102 mm) guns. One gun each was mounted on the forecastle and the quarterdeck. The remaining ten guns were placed port and starboard amidships. They also carried eight QF 3-pounder Hotchkiss guns and two above water 18-inch (450 mm) torpedo tubes. The ships' protective deck armour ranged in thickness from .75 to 2 inches (19 to 51 mm). The main guns were fitted with 1-inch (25 mm) gun shields and the conning tower had armour 3 inches (76 mm) thick.

== Construction ==
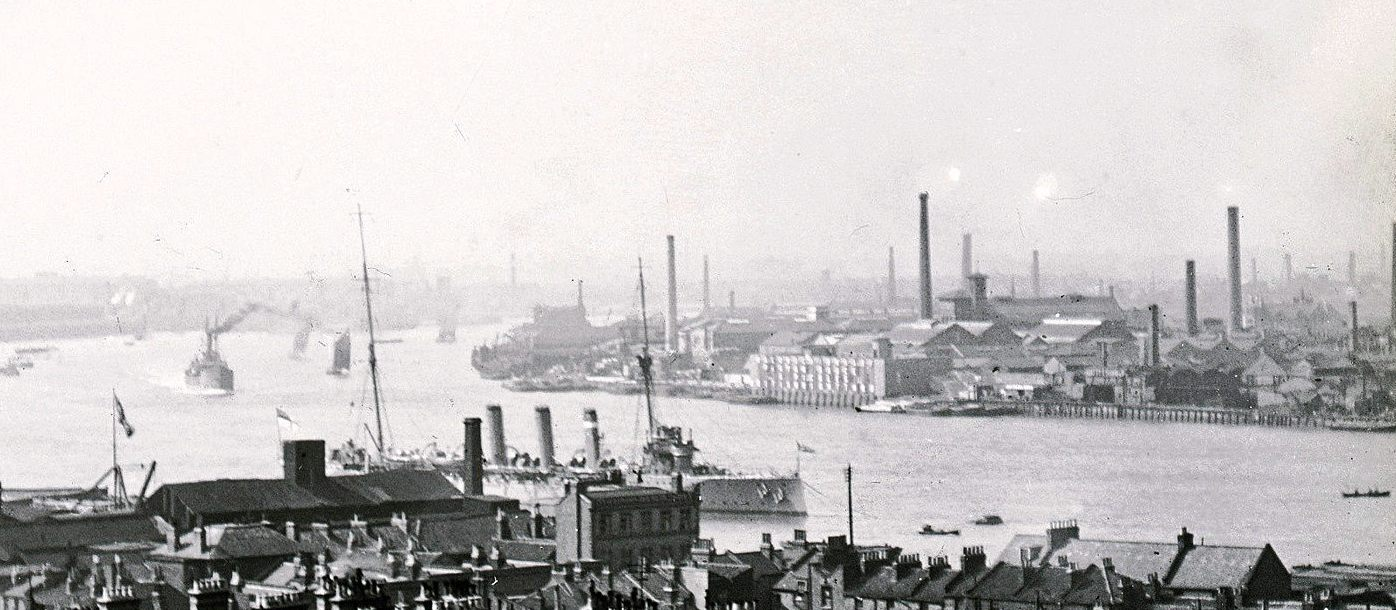
Sapphire in the Thames 1909 Review, passing Deptford

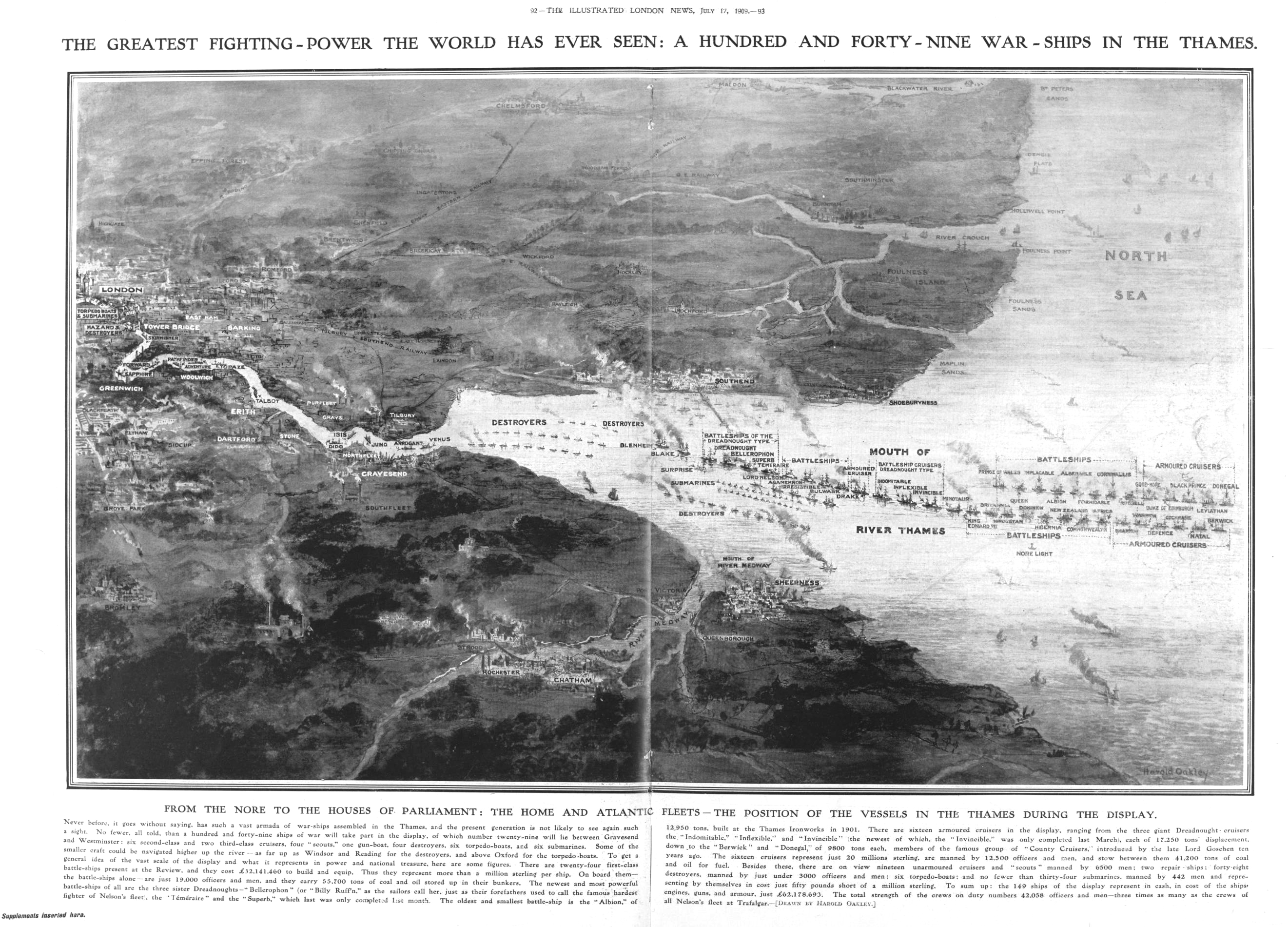
The Great Naval Display in the Thames of 17-24 July 1909

She was laid down in January 1904 at Palmers in their Jarrow shipyard, launched on 17 March 1904 and completed in February 1905.

== Service ==
Sapphire was commissioned on 2 July 1914 at Chatham Dock, Kent, before moving out into Kethole Reach, in the estuary of the Medway. On 16 July, Sapphire for set sail from Sheerness Docks, Kent, for Spithead, Hampshire, where she took part in the Royal Fleet Review on 20 July.

On 8 January 1918, Sapphire arrived at Aden where Commander W. F. Sells joined from HMS Minto and took over command.

Sapphire was sold to TW Ward Ltd for breaking up at Grays, Essex on 9 May 1921.

== Bibliography ==
- Chesneau, Roger & Kolesnik, Eugene M., eds. (1979). Conway's All the World's Fighting Ships 1860–1905. Greenwich: Conway Maritime Press. ISBN 0-8317-0302-4.
- Corbett, Julian (March 1997). Naval Operations to the Battle of the Falklands. History of the Great War: Based on Official Documents. Vol. I (2nd, reprint of the 1938 ed.). London and Nashville, Tennessee: Imperial War Museum and Battery Press. ISBN 0-89839-256-X.
- Friedman, Norman (2012). British Cruisers of the Victorian Era. Barnsley, South Yorkshire, UK: Seaforth. ISBN 978-1-59114-068-9.
- Friedman, Norman (2011). Naval Weapons of World War One. Barnsley, South Yorkshire, UK: Seaforth. ISBN 978-1-84832-100-7.
- Gardiner, Robert & Gray, Randal, eds. (1985). Conway's All the World's Fighting Ships 1906–1921. Annapolis, Maryland: Naval Institute Press. ISBN 0-85177-245-5.
