= HMS Topaze (1903) =

Topaze-class cruiser

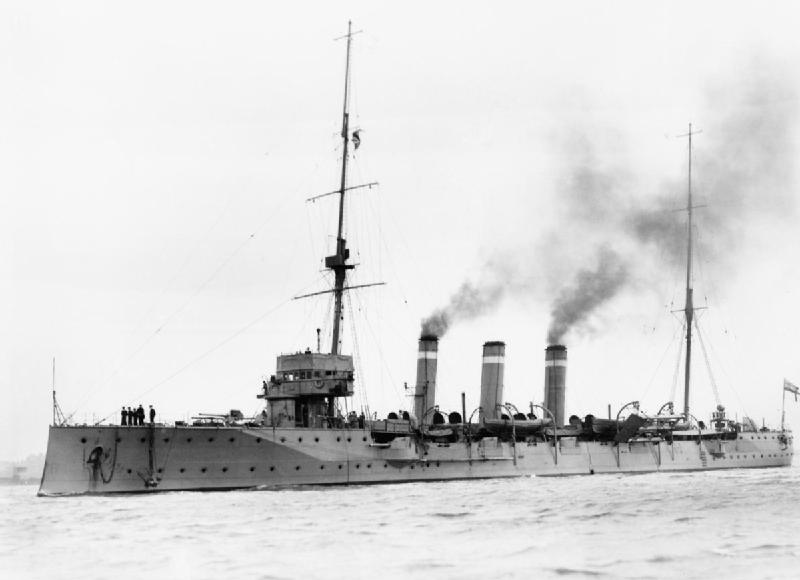
- HMS Topaze in wartime service

History

United Kingdom
- Name: HMS Topaze
- Namesake: Topaz
- Builder: Laird Brothers, Birkenhead
- Laid down: 14 August 1902
- Launched: 23 July 1903
- Commissioned: 6 December 1904
- Decommissioned: 7 October 1919
- Out of service: 22 September 1921
- Fate: Sold to be broken up

General characteristics
- Class & type: Topaze-class protected cruiser
- Displacement: 3,000 long tons (3,048 t) (deep load)
- Length: 373 ft 9 in (113.9 m) (o.a.)
- Beam: 40 ft (12 m)
- Draught: 14 ft 6 in (4.42 m)
- Installed power: 10 Normand boilers; 98,000 ihp (73,000 kW)
- Propulsion: 2 4-cylinder triple expansion engines
- Speed: 21.75 knots (40.3 km/h; 25.0 mph)
- Range: 7,000 nmi (13,000 km; 8,100 mi) at 10 knots (19 km/h; 12 mph)
- Complement: 296
- Armament: 12 × QF 4 in (102 mm) Mark III guns (12×1); 8 × QF 3-pdr (47 mm) guns (8×1); 4 × 0.303 in (8 mm) guns (4×1); 2 × 18 in (457 mm) torpedo tubes (2×1)
- Armour: 0.75 to 2 in (19 to 51 mm) deck; 1 in (25 mm) gun shields; 3 in (76 mm) conning tower

HMS Topaze was a Topaze-class protected or third-class cruiser which served in the Royal Navy during the First World War. The vessel was the lead ship of the class, also known as the Gem class, which had a more powerful armament and were faster than preceding protected cruisers. Launched on 23 June 1904, Topaze joined the Channel Fleet and often acted as a flotilla leader for the destroyers of the Navy. At the beginning of the First World War, the cruiser operated with the Fifth Battle Squadron, but was transferred to the Mediterranean Fleet in 1915. There, the cruiser operated with ships of the Italian Regia Marina to enforce the blockade on Albania and to escort ships carrying Italian troops and supplies across the Adriatic Sea. Topaze escorted shipping in the Indian Ocean and captured the Ottoman Army garrison on the island of Kamaran in 1917, but returned to the Mediterranean before the end of the year. After the Armistice in 1918, the cruiser returned to the United Kingdom and was decommissioned on 7 October 1919.

== Design and development ==
Topaze was the first of two Topaze-class protected cruisers, or Gem-class third-class cruisers ordered by the British Admiralty under the 1902/1903 Programme. The design followed the same philosophy as the preceding Pelorus class, but had more armour, mounted more guns, was faster and had improved seakeeping. The cruiser had an overall length of 373 feet 9 inches (113.92 m) and a length of 360 ft (110 m) between perpendiculars, with a beam of 40 feet (12.19 m) and a draught of 14 feet 6 inches (4.42 m). Displacement was 3,000 long tons (3,048 t) at deep load.

Power was provided by ten Normand boilers venting through three funnels which fed two 4-cylinder triple-expansion steam engines rated at 98,000 shaft horsepower (73,000 kW) and drove two propeller shafts to provide a design speed of 21.75 knots (40.28 km/h; 25.03 mph). On trials, the engines peaked at more than 10,000 shaft horsepower (7,500 kW) to give a maximum speed exceeding 22 knots (41 km/h; 25 mph). A total of 450 long tons (457 t) of coal was carried to give a design range of 7,000 nautical miles (13,000 km; 8,100 mi) at 10 knots (19 km/h; 12 mph) and 2,000 nautical miles (3,700 km; 2,300 mi) at 20 knots (37 km/h; 23 mph). The ship had a complement of 296 officers and ratings.

Armament consisted of twelve QF 4 in (102 mm) Mark III guns, one mounted fore and another aft, the remainder lining the sides to give a broadside of seven guns. Each mount had a gun shield with 1 in (25 mm) of armour. A secondary armament of eight QF 3-pdr (47 mm) guns and four Vickers 0.303 in (8 mm) Maxim guns was carried for protection against torpedo boats and other light craft. The original design had no torpedo tubes. However, two tubes for 18 in (457 mm) torpedoes were fitted before the ship was launched. Deck armour varied from 0.75 mm (0 in) to 2 in (51 mm). Fire control was undertaken from conning towers which were fitted with 3 in (76 mm) of armour.

== Construction and career ==
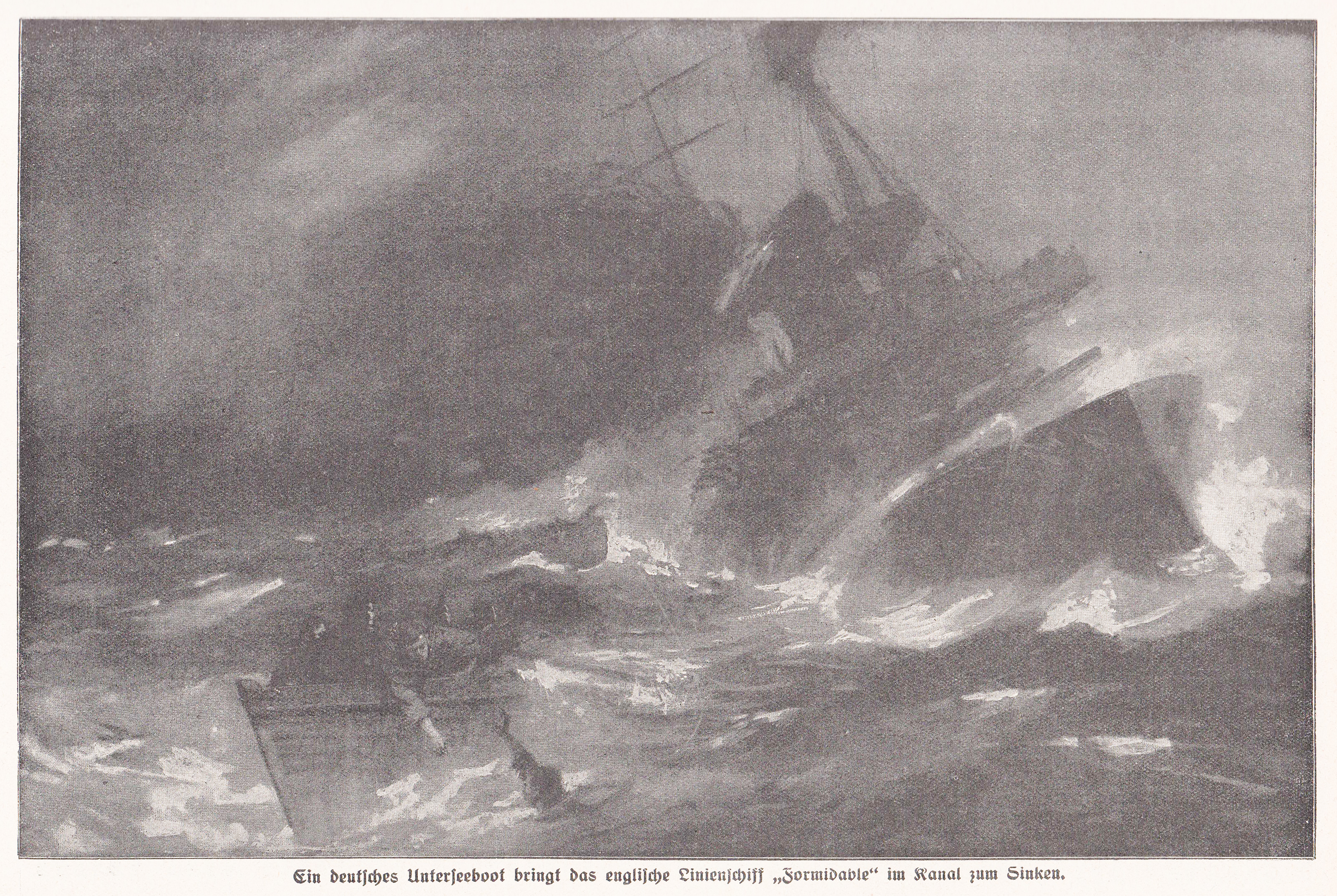
The sinking of HMS Formidable

Laid down by Laird Brothers at Birkenhead on 14 August 1902 and launched on 23 July the following year, Topaze was completed in November 1904. The vessel was the fourth of the name in Royal Navy service. The first had been a frigate of the French Navy named after the topaz gemstone that had been captured in 1793 and the French spelling was continued in subsequent ships. This incarnation was commissioned on 6 December into the Cruiser Squadron of the Channel Fleet. On 4 December 1906, the cruiser was given a new commission and attached to support the battleships of the Channel Fleet Battle Squadron. On 10 August 1909, the cruiser joined the newly formed Fourth Destroyer Flotilla based at Portsmouth as the flotilla leader. On 1 April 1913, the cruiser was recommissioned at Chatham and reassigned back to Portsmouth as part of the Sixth Battle Squadron.

At the start of the First World War, Topaze was serving with the Fifth Battle Squadron under the battleship Prince of Wales. The squadron was allocated to the Channel Fleet. The cruiser remained with the squadron as it declined in size, warships being transferred to other postings. On 2 November, the ship joined the remaining battleships as part of the Channel Fleet based at Portland. On 28 December, the cruiser was escorting the battleship Formidable out on gunnery exercises. The small flotilla had no destroyer escort and was therefore vulnerable to submarine attack. The German submarine U-24 took advantage of this vulnerability and torpedoed the battleship on 1 January 1915. Topaze saw the larger vessel list to starboard as the sailors starting to evacuate the stricken ship. Heavy sea hindered the rescue, but 43 were saved by the cruiser before the battleship finally sank.

The escalating warfare in the Mediterranean in 1915 led to the gradual transfer of the Channel Fleet to the theatre. By 8 April, Topaze was the only vessel remaining, alongside the battleship Exmouth, in the command. Initially, it was envisaged that the cruiser would join the newly formed Sixth Light Cruiser Squadron, but Topaze proved too slow to keep up with the more modern ships. Instead, the cruiser left Dover to join the Mediterranean Fleet on 23 June. There, British vessels operated with the Regia Marina against the forces of the Austro-Hungarian Navy. On 28 July, the cruiser joined three Italian destroyers in hunting a raiding force at Pelagosa.

The allies then enforced a blockade in the Adriatic Sea from 6 October. The importance of the blockade was such that even when more modern light cruisers arrived, Topaze remained on station. After 27 November the arrangement was systematised so that a typical patrol would involve the cruiser and one or two destroyers spending 30 hours off the coast of Albania. The cruiser was also used on occasion to monitor the line of drifters that the navy had deployed to monitor potential blockade runners. In addition, the cruiser was involved in escorting Italian troops and supplies to serve in the Balkans theatre, including 20,000 soldiers carried to Vlorë. It was during one of these sailings, on 4 December, that the cruiser was attacked by a submarine along with the Italian destroyer Ardente. The submarine launched three torpedoes but neither ship was damaged. Such action was rare and the cruiser spent the next year cruising far from the enemy.

On 4 March 1917, Topaze was reposted to the East Indies Station. The cruiser was sent, along with protected cruiser Doris and Exmouth, to perform escort duties in the Indian Ocean in exchange for the Japanese sending the protected cruiser Akashi and eight destroyers to the Mediterranean. Topaze was based at Aden. The reinforcements proved invaluable in providing safety to shipping navigating crucial trade routes, from Freemantle to Colombo, the Red Sea and Cape Town, and between Mumbai and the Persian Gulf. The cruiser also supported the South Arabian Campaign, helping with the blockade and participating in the attack on the Ottoman Army on the island of Kamaran. On 10 June, Topaze left Aden to attack the Ottoman forces there. Two days later, the ship was stationed off the port of As-Salif, remaining so close to the coast that the defenders could not get the warship's range and their guns overshot. The cruiser then dispatched a landing party that captured the garrison there. Soon after, the ship returned to the Mediterranean, joining the Egyptian Division of the Mediterranean Fleet based at Alexandria. The need at the time was for escorts to protect convoys as the routes across the Mediterranean grew from seven in November 1917 to nineteen in June 1918.

After the Armistice of 11 November 1918 and the end of the First World War, the Royal Navy no longer needed as many vessels in service. By the middle of the following year,Topaze was the only light cruiser remaining at the Royal Navy base in Egypt. The ship sailed to Portsmouth and was decommissioned on 7 October 1919. On 22 September 1921, the cruiser was sold to G Cohen to be broken up in Germany.

== Pennant numbers ==
Pennant number	Date
P29	1914
P2A	September 1915
P1C	January 1918
