= William Crawshaw =

New Zealand cricketer

Personal information
- Full name: William Joseph Crawshaw
- Born: 1861; Melbourne, Australia
- Died: 11 February 1938 (aged 76–77); Caterham, England
- Batting: Left-handed

Domestic team information
- Years: Team
- 1877/78–1883/84: Otago
- 1885/86–1887/88: Canterbury
- 1891/92: Wellington
- 1896/97–1897/98: Taranaki

Career statistics
Competition	First-class
Matches	13
Runs scored	393
Batting average	17.08
100s/50s	1/0
Top score	106
Catches/stumpings	10/0
- Source: CricketArchive, 14 January 2017

William Crawshaw (1861 – 11 February 1938) was a New Zealand cricketer. He played first-class cricket for Canterbury, Otago, Taranaki and Wellington between 1877 and 1898.

Crawshaw moved around New Zealand in his work for the Bank of New Zealand. An opening batsman, he scored 106, his only first-class century, in March 1897, when Taranaki beat Hawke's Bay by an innings and 42 runs. It was also Taranaki's only individual first-class century, in Taranaki's only first-class victory.

In January 1898, in a non-first-class match for Taranaki against a team from Wanganui, he carried his bat for 174 not out in a team total of 363 in five hours. It was part of a sequence of four innings in which he made 54 not out, 115 not out, 174 not out, and 71: 414 runs for once out.

Crawshaw retired in 1916 and went to live in England.
