= George Bayly =

New Zealand cricketer and rugby union footballer (1856–1938)

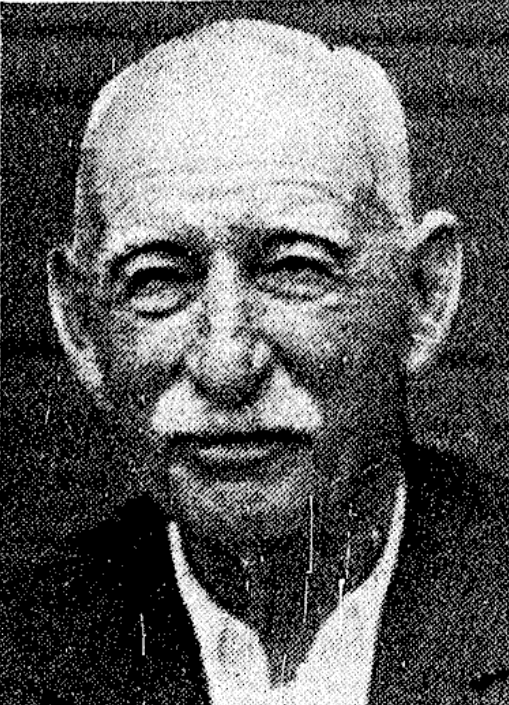
- Bayly in the 1930s

Personal information
- Full name: George Thomas Bayly
- Born: 17 March 1856; New Plymouth, New Zealand
- Died: 26 June 1938 (aged 82); Stanmore Bay, Auckland, New Zealand
- Bowling: Right-arm medium
- Role: Bowler
- Relatives: Alfred Bayly (brother); Neville Hill (son-in-law)

Domestic team information
- Years: Team
- 1882/83–1897/98: Taranaki

Career statistics
Competition	First-class
Matches	8
Runs scored	36
Batting average	3.27
100s/50s	0/0
Top score	12
Balls bowled	838
Wickets	17
Bowling average	18.76
5 wickets in innings	0
10 wickets in match	0
Best bowling	3/19
Catches/stumpings	3/0
- Source: ESPNcricinfo, 18 April 2025

George Thomas Bayly (17 March 1856 – 26 June 1938) was a New Zealand cricketer, rugby union footballer, and administrator of both sports.

== Family ==
George Bayly was the eldest of nine brothers. He and his brother Fred attended Newington College in Sydney in 1874 and 1875. Both brothers played in Newington's 1st XV Rugby and 1st XI cricket teams. Several of the brothers represented their regions at cricket and rugby. Alfred captained the New Zealand rugby team in the 1890s.

== Cricket ==
Bayly played eight first-class matches for Taranaki between 1882 and 1898. He also played for Wellington against the touring English team in 1881–82, when he bowled throughout the English innings and took 5 for 106 off 92 four-ball overs.

Bayly donated the land on which Bayly Park in Hāwera was constructed in the 1890s. He helped to develop it into the town's main sports venue, hosting cricket, football, tennis and cycling.

== Rugby union ==
Bayly was one of the best rugby players on the Taranaki club scene and in representative rugby. As a representative player he appeared in several games from 1876 to 1883 for the Hawera club. In 1879, he played two games for the Wellington district XV, scoring a try and a goal. He became President of the Taranaki Rugby Union in 1889 and held that position until 1898, when he was elected as President of the New Zealand Rugby Union.

== Personal life ==
Bayly was a sheep farmer at Mokoia, near Hāwera. He married Alfreda Gertrude Dawson-Welsh in Wanganui in May 1887. They moved to Auckland in about 1910. She died at their home in Epsom in November 1919. They had three sons and three daughters. Two of their sons died young. One of their daughters married the New Zealand Olympic long-distance runner Neville Hill.

Bayly died at Stanmore Bay, Auckland, in June 1938, aged 82.
