= Taranaki cricket team =

New Zealand cricket team

Personnel
- Captain: Jordan Gard
- Coach: Chris Coombe
- Owner: Taranaki Cricket Association

Team information
- Founded: 1877
- Home ground: Pukekura Park, New Plymouth

History
- Hawke Cup wins: 7
- Official website: Taranaki Cricket Association

The Taranaki cricket team represents the Taranaki Region of New Zealand. It is one of the 21 teams from around New Zealand that compete in the Hawke Cup.

Taranaki as a representative team played as early as 1877. The Taranaki Cricket Association was formed in Hāwera in March 1894, and its first annual meeting was held in Hāwera in September 1894. The clubs in the association at the time were Hawera, Hawera Star, New Plymouth, Clifton, Stratford, Unity and Opunake.

== First-class matches ==
Between 1883 and 1898 Taranaki played eight matches that are now considered first-class. They won one match, lost six and drew one.

=== 1882–83 ===
- At Auckland Domain in March 1883, Auckland 241 defeated Taranaki 63 and 55 by an innings and 123 runs. For Auckland William Lankham bowled unchanged throughout the match to take 13 for 35 (7 for 13 and 6 for 22). Eight of the Taranaki players were playing their first first-class match.

=== 1891–92 ===
- In January 1892 Taranaki travelled to Clive, near Napier, to play Hawke's Bay at Farndon Park. The match was all over in one day. Taranaki made 70 and 39, and Hawke's Bay, scoring 103 and 7 for no wicket, won by ten wickets. Hawke's Bay's Arthur Gore took 2 for 21 and 6 for 26 and made the highest score of the match, 33 not out. For Taranaki, Alfred Bayly took 6 for 54; he was one of seven Taranaki players making their first-class debuts.
- Three months later, in April, the two teams played a return match at Bayly Park in Hāwera. Although Hawke's Bay made only 128 in their first innings, they won by an innings and 64 runs, dismissing Taranaki for 35 and 29. For Hawke's Bay, Charles Smith, bowling unchanged, took 13 for 33 (7 for 20 and 6 for 13).

=== 1894–95 ===
- In the last match of their tour of New Zealand in 1894–95, Fiji played Taranaki at Bayly Park in February 1895. Taranaki made 91 and 135, and Fiji made 99 and 129 for 8 to win by two wickets. Wilikonisoni Tuivanuavou took 5 for 25 and 5 for 37 (all ten victims were bowled) for Fiji, while for Taranaki William Mills took 6 for 35 and 6 for 55 on his first-class debut.
- In April 1895 Taranaki visited Hawke's Bay again, this time to play at Napier Recreation Ground. However, rain halted play after Hawke's Bay had scored 144 for no wicket.

=== 1896–97 ===
- Taranaki won for the only time in March 1897, when they beat Hawke's Bay by an innings and 42 runs at Bayly Park. They scored 246, William Crawshaw (106) and Percy Pratt (85) adding 114 for the third wicket. Taranaki then dismissed Hawke's Bay for 104 and 100, Bernard McCarthy taking seven wickets.

=== 1897–98 ===
- In late December 1897, Taranaki lost to Hawke's Bay by an innings and 38 runs at Napier Recreation Ground. Hawke's Bay made 334 then dismissed Taranaki for 124 and 172. Bernard McCarthy was Taranaki's most successful bowler again, taking 5 for 109, as well as top-scoring in each innings with 27 and 52. For Hawke's Bay, Jack Wolstenholme scored 103, and Harry Fannin took 8 for 49 and 3 for 42.
- A few days later, in the new year, Canterbury visited Bayly Park. Canterbury made 260, then dismissed Taranaki for 108 and 109, Dan Reese taking 5 for 52 and 6 for 43, to win by an innings and 43 runs.

Taranaki's 13 innings totals (63, 55, 70, 39, 35, 29, 91, 135, 246, 124, 172, 108, 109) add up to 1276 runs for 130 wickets, an average of 9.81 runs per wicket. Their opponents scored 1649 runs for 88 wickets, an average of 18.73.

== South Taranaki and North Taranaki ==
In the early 1900s Taranaki cricket split into South Taranaki (centred in Hāwera) and North Taranaki (centred in New Plymouth). The two teams competed separately in the Hawke Cup from 1910–11 to 1922–23. Neither won the title. Occasionally a united team played during this period. In 1909–10 they played the touring Australian team and drew a close match in which the Taranaki bowler Tom Southall took 11 wickets.

== Current status ==
Taranaki reunited in the mid-1920s, and since 1926–27 they have competed in the Hawke Cup. In their first challenge match, captained by Charles Kingstone, Taranaki beat Wanganui, Charles Clark taking 13 wickets. They thus gained the title, which they held until Wanganui defeated them in the next season. Taranaki have held the title several times since, most recently by defeating Hawke's Bay in February 2025.

The Taranaki Cricket Association is based in New Plymouth. The Association forms part of the Central Districts cricket team, which began taking part in the Plunket Shield in 1950–51 and now competes in first-class, List A and Twenty20 domestic cricket competitions. Since the 1920s Taranaki have played most of their home matches at Pukekura Park in New Plymouth, which is also regularly used by Central Districts.

== See also ==
- List of Taranaki representative cricketers
