= HMS Beagle (1909) =

Destroyer of the Royal Navy

History

United Kingdom
- Name: HMS Beagle
- Builder: John Brown & Company, Clydebank
- Laid down: 17 March 1909
- Launched: 16 October 1909
- Commissioned: 10 June 1910
- Honours and awards: Dardanelles 1915–1916
- Fate: Sold for breaking, 1 November 1921

General characteristics
- Class & type: Beagle-class destroyer
- Displacement: 860 long tons (874 t)
- Length: 287 ft (87 m)
- Beam: 28 ft (8.5 m)
- Draught: 8 ft 9 in (2.67 m)
- Installed power: 12,500 hp (9,300 kW) under a forced draught
- Propulsion: 5 x Yarrow Coal-fired boilers, 3 x Parson's steam turbines driving 3 shafts
- Speed: 27 knots (50 km/h; 31 mph)
- Range: 205 long tons (208 t) tons coal 1,530 NM @ 15 Knots
- Complement: 96
- Armament: 1 × 4-in (102 mm) /40 BL Mark VIII naval gun, on a CP Mk III* mounting; 3 × QF 12 pdr 12 cwt Mark I, mounting P Mark I; 2 × single 21 inch (533 mm) torpedo tubes

HMS Beagle was one of sixteen destroyers ordered under the 1908–09 Naval Estimates from John Brown & Company of Clydebank. Named for the English hunting dog, she was the sixth ship to carry this name since it was introduced for a Cruizer Class fir-built, brig-sloop on 8 August 1804 and sold on 21 July 1814. The destroyers of the 1908–09 program would be the last coal-fired destroyers of the Royal Navy. She and her sisters served in the First Destroyer Flotilla then were moved en masse to the Third Destroyer Flotilla and before the start of the Great War to the Fifth Destroyer Flotilla. With the advent of the convoy system they were moved to the Second Destroyer Flotilla. With the Armistice she was laid up then scrapped in 1921.

== Construction and design ==
Laid down as Yard number 387 on 17 March 1909 at the John Brown & Company's shipyard at Clydebank, Beagle was launched on 16 October 1909.

Beagle was 269 feet (82.0 m) long between perpendiculars, with a beam of 26 feet 7 inches (8.10 m) and a draught of 8 feet 6 inches (2.59 m). Displacement was 950 long tons (970 t) normal. Five Yarrow boilers fed steam at 220 pounds per square inch (1,500 kPa) to Parsons steam turbines rated at 12,500 shaft horsepower (9,300 kW), driving three shafts and giving a design speed of 27 knots (50 km/h; 31 mph). During sea trials she reached a speed of 27.12 knots (50.23 km/h; 31.21 mph).

== Service ==
She was commissioned on 10 June 1910 under the command of Lieutenant Lionel J.G. Anderson, RN for service with the First Destroyer Flotilla of the First Division of the Home Fleet tendered to Blake. On 23 June 1911 she was in attendance as part of the 1st Destroyer Flotilla for the Coronation Naval Review by King George V at Spithead. By 1 May 1912 she was assigned to the Third Destroyer Flotilla tendered to Blenheim.

On 30 August 1912 the Admiralty directed all destroyer classes were to be designated by alpha characters starting with the letter 'A'. After 30 September 1913, she was known as a G Class destroyer and had the letter ‘G’ painted on her hull below the bridge area and on her fore funnel.

In October 1913 as the L-class destroyers came on line the entire G-class was moved to the Mediterranean as the newly formed Fifth Destroyer Flotilla along with the depot ship Blenheim.

With war clouds looming on 2 August 1914 the Fifth Destroyer Flotilla was involved in the search for Goeben and Breslau in the Mediterranean. On 3 August, the 3rd Division of the 5th Flotilla (Beagle, Bulldog, Grasshopper and Harpy) were at Malta and while it was initially planned that they reinforce Rear Admiral Ernest Troubridge's squadron patrolling the entrance to the Adriatic, they remained at Malta until 6 August, when Beagle and Bulldog left in company with the cruiser Dublin. Goeben and Breslau had been spotted by the cruiser Gloucester east of the Straits of Messina later that day, with Gloucester shadowing the two German ships on their course towards Cape Matapan. Dublin and her two destroyers were ordered to intercept Goeben and Breslau, and expected to make a night torpedo attack off Zante. Breslau was sighted and chased for a while, but the ships turned away to intercept the more important Goeben, but missed the German battlecruiser during the night.

On 9 August, Beagle and Bulldog joined the 1st Division at Port Vathi on the Island of Ithaca off the west coast of Greece. The units of the 1st Division were short of coal and were awaiting the arrival of a collier. After coaling the ten destroyers were ordered to establish a patrol line in the Aegean Sea off the Dardanelles thereby blockading the German ships there.

In November 1914, as a response to a shortage of destroyers in home waters, Beagle was recalled to Britain, reaching Plymouth on 29 November, and being used to operate from Portsmouth, patrolling the routes used by cross-Channel transports. It had been planned to use the Beagles to equip a new Tenth Destroyer Flotilla based at Harwich, but the need for escorts for transports in the Channel led to these plans being abandoned, and the ships remained at Portsmouth. They were heavily used, with Beagle raising steam on 26 days out of 28 in February 1915.

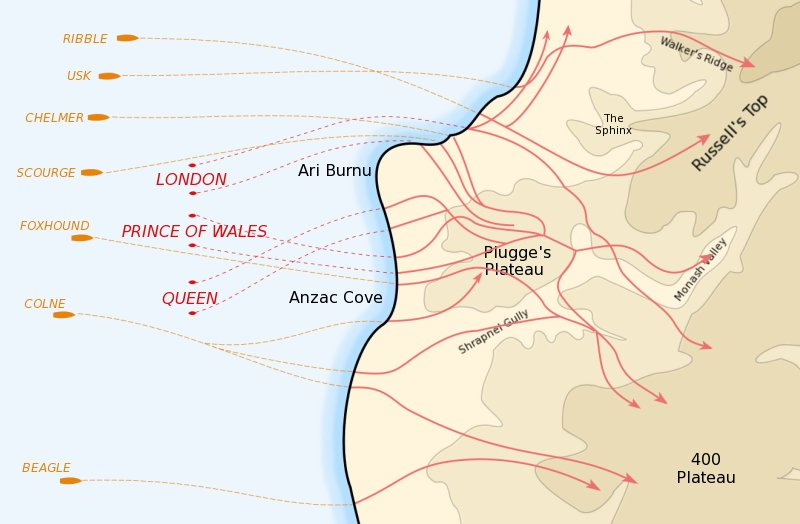
The landings at Anzac Cove, 25 April 1915

On 26 March 1915, following the failure of attempts to force the Dardanelles had failed, these eight Beagles were ordered to Mudros for operations in support of the Dardanelles Campaign. On 25 April 1915, Beagle took part in the Landing at Anzac Cove, carrying troops of the 9th Battalion, Royal Queensland Regiment who were landed in row boats. On the night of 12/13 May, the pre-dreadnought battleships Goliath and Cornwallis were anchored in Morto Bay, supporting French troops. To protect the two battleships, Beagle and Bulldog patrolled the north side of the straits, with Scorpion and Wolverine patrolling the southern side and Pincher in the centre of the straits. Despite these patrols, the Turkish destroyer Muavenet-i Milliye managed to sneak past Beagle and Bulldog on the northern side of the straits and torpedoed and sunk Goliath before successfully escaping.

On 28 June Beagle, together with the destroyers Bulldog, Racoon and Basilisk escorted the cruiser Talbot as she provided naval gun support to the advancing British and Indian troops during the Battle of Gully Ravine. The British made another attempt to break the stalemate at Gallipoli on 6–7 August 1915, with the Landing at Suvla Bay, to the north of Anzac Cove. This time, instead of row-boats, armoured shallow-draught self-propelled landing craft known as "Beetles" were used, which were towed close to shore by destroyers. While the main landing took place on Nibrunesi beach to the south of Suvla Bay, Beagle, together with Bulldog and Grampus landed troops of the 34th Brigade in Suvla Bay itself. Each destroyer carried 500 troops aboard, while towing a "Beetle" carrying a further 500 troops. The "Beetles" would land their troops and then return to pick up the remaining troops on the destroyers and land them. While the landings on Nibrunesi beach went well, those in Suvla Bay were less successful, landing to the south of the planned place, with the result that the "Beetles" ran aground off shore, with the remaining troops aboard the destroyers having to be landed by reserve row boats. Beagle's troops were not all landed until nearly 5:00 AM on 7 August, several hours late. Beagle helped to cover the evacuations from Anzac Cove on 20 December 1915.

On 13 December 1916 Beagle and Racoon were involved in a friendly fire incident when on patrol near Kum Kale. Both destroyers raced to engage a low flying aircraft. HMS Racoon fired four shells causing damaged to the aircraft and forcing it to alight on the water. HMS Racoon rescued the French pilot and observer then towed the aircraft to Kephelo Air Base on Imbros. On 9 January 1917, Beagle was escorting the pre-dreadnought Cornwallis, on passage from Mudros to Malta, when Cornwallis was torpedoed twice by the German submarine U-32. When attempts at damage control failed and it was clear that Cornwallis was sinking, Beagle went alongside the battleship and took off her crew. After this was complete, and Beagle had pushed off from Cornwallis, U-32 struck the battleship with a third torpedo. An attempt by Beagle to depth charge the German submarine was unsuccessful. Fifteen of Cornwallis's crew were lost in her sinking.

In mid-1917 as the convoy system was being introduced, the Admiralty began reassigning older destroyers to escort duties. She was recalled to home waters and assigned to the 2nd Destroyer Flotilla now based at Buncrana, near Lough Swilly in the north of Ireland in October 1917. Equipped with depth charges she was employed for anti-submarine patrols and as a convoy escort for the North West Approaches to the British Isles for the remainder of the war.

== Disposition ==
By March 1919, with the disbandment of the Second Destroyer Flotilla she was withdrawn from active service and laid up in reserve at the Nore. In April 1920 she was placed on the disposal list. She was sold on 1 November 1921 to B. Fryer of Sunderland for breaking.
