= HMS Harpy (1909) =

Destroyer of the Royal Navy

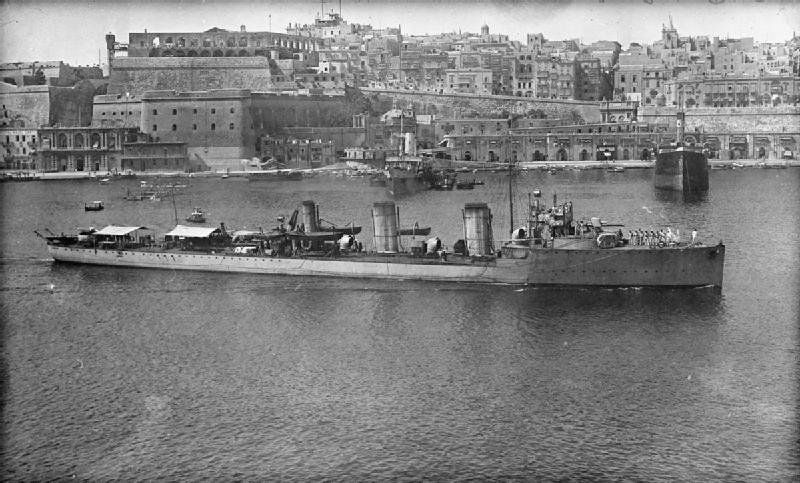
- Sister ship Basilisk

History

United Kingdom
- Name: Harpy
- Namesake: Harpy
- Builder: J. Samuel White, Cowes
- Laid down: 23 April 1909
- Launched: 27 November 1909
- Commissioned: 29 July 1910
- Out of service: 27 November 1921
- Fate: Sold to the broken up

General characteristics
- Class & type: Beagle-class destroyer
- Displacement: 972 long tons (988 t) (normal)
- Length: 266 ft (81.1 m)
- Beam: 28 ft (8.5 m)
- Draught: 16 ft 6 in (5.0 m)
- Installed power: 5 x coal-fired White-Forster boilers, 12,000 shp (8,900 kW)
- Propulsion: 3 x steam turbines driving 3 shafts
- Speed: 27 kn (50 km/h; 31 mph)
- Range: 2,000 nmi (3,700 km; 2,300 mi) at 15 knots (28 km/h; 17 mph)
- Complement: 96
- Armament: 1 × 4 in (102 mm) gun; 3 × 12 pdr 3 in (76 mm) guns; 2 × single 21 in (533 mm) torpedo tubes

HMS Harpy was a Beagle-class (from 1913 G-class) destroyer of the British Royal Navy. The Beagles were coal-fuelled ships, designed for a speed of 27 kn (31 miles per hour; 50 kilometres per hour) and armed with a 4 in (102 mm) gun and two torpedo tubes. Built by J. Samuel White on the Isle of Wight and launched in 1909, Harpy was initially commissioned the following year into the First Destroyer Flotilla at Portsmouth. In 1912, the warship joined the Third Destroyer Flotilla before being transferred to the Mediterranean Fleet as part of the Fifth Destroyer Flotilla in 1913. As the First World War approached in 1914, the destroyer was based in Alexandra, Egypt, but was swiftly redeployed to Malta, followed, in 1915, by action in the Dardanelles Campaign. The destroyer subsequently served as an escort to convoys based at Buncrana, Ireland. After the Armistice of 1918 that ended the war, Harpy was initially transferred to the Nore and then sold in 1921 to be broken up.

== Design and development ==
Harpy was one of the Beagle-class destroyers ordered as part of the 1908–1909 shipbuilding programme. The vessels were coal-burning after concerns had been raised about the availability of fuel oil in time of war and the bridge was larger and higher than previous designs. This reduced costs, although it also meant that five boilers were needed, the extra machinery meaning that deck space became more premium. The Beagle class vessels were not built to a standard design, with detailed design being left to the builders of individual ships in accordance with a loose specification, in this case J. Samuel White. In October 1913, as part of a wider renaming of the Royal Navy's warships into classes named alphabetically, the class was renamed as G-class. (Note: The Laforey-class (L-class) under construction were renamed so the destroyers' names matched the class designation.)

Harpy was 275 ft (83.8 m) long, with a beam of 28 ft (8.5 m) and a draught of 16 ft 6 in (5 m). Normal displacement was 972 long tons (988 t). Five White-Forster boilers fed direct-drive Parsons steam turbines driving three shafts. Two funnels were fitted. The machinery was rated at 12,000 shaft horsepower (8,900 kW) giving a design speed of 27 kn (31 miles per hour; 50 kilometres per hour). During sea trials, the destroyer reached a speed of 27.755 kn (31.940 mph; 51.402 km/h). Up to 226 long tons (230 t) of coal was carried, giving a design range of 2,000 nautical miles (3,700 km; 2,300 mi) at 15 knots (28 km/h; 17 mph). The ship had a complement of 96 officers and ratings.

Armament consisted of one 4 in (102 mm) BL Mk VIII gun forward and three 3 in (76 mm) QF 12-pounder 12 cwt guns aft. (Note: "Cwt" is the abbreviation for hundredweight, 12cwt referring to the weight of the gun.) Torpedo armament consisted of two rotating 21 in (533 mm) torpedo tubes, one placed forward and the other aft. Two spare torpedoes were carried. On 8 April 1916, the Admiralty approved fitting the destroyer with depth charges. Two depth charge launchers and two charges were initially carried. By June 1918, this has expanded to 16 depth charges launched from Thornycroft throwers and 50 from racks mounted aft.

== Construction and career ==
Harpy was laid down by J. Samuel White at East Cowes on the Isle of Wight with the yard number 1292 on 23 April 1909, and launched on 27 November. The ship cost £114,404. Harpy was the fifth to serve in the Royal Navy named for the monster with the face of a woman and the wings of a bird. The vessel was commissioned at Portsmouth on 29 July 1910. Harpy initially joined the First Destroyer Flotilla but, in 1912, a reorganisation of the Home Fleet resulted in the ships of the Beagle class forming the new Third Destroyer Flotilla. The vessel remained part of the Third Flotilla in March 1913. Shortly afterwards, Harpy was transferred, along with the rest of the class, to the newly-formed Fifth Destroyer Flotilla as part of the Mediterranean Fleet.

In 1914, as the First World War approached, Harpy was part of the Third Division of the Fifth Flotilla and based in Alexandra. The destroyer sailed to Malta, although the island had a coal shortage, which restricted the vessel's activity. On 2 August, the Fifth Destroyer Flotilla was involved in the search for the German battlecruiser Goeben and light cruiser Breslau in the Mediterranean. On 3 August, the Third Division, which consisted of Beagle, Bulldog, Grasshopper and Harpy, were at Malta. While the Admiralty initially planned that the division reinforce Rear Admiral Ernest Troubridge's squadron patrolling the entrance to the Adriatic, Harpy, along with Grasshopper and Grampus, was instead sent to patrol the southern end of the Straits of Messina on 7 October. The attempts to intercept Goeben and Breslau failed, and the two German ships reached Turkey on 10 August.

Harpy spent the next year supporting the naval operations in the Dardanelles Campaign with the Eastern Mediterranean Squadron. On 25 May, the destroyer succeeded in driving off a submarine that could have attacked the French battleship Saint Louis. The ship was one of five, including sister ship Renard, that undertook minesweeping in the Dardanelles on 25 and 26 June. Despite heavy fire, the ships achieved their objective in what Rear Admiral John de Robeck, commander of the squadron, described as "a most satisfactory manner".

Harpy stayed with the Eastern Mediterranean Squadron into 1916. The year saw an intensification of submarine action by the Imperial German Navy in the Mediterranean Sea and an increasing demand on destroyers as escorts. In February alone, fifty ships, totalling 101,000 long tons (103,000 t), were sunk. However, the ship also saw other duties, including supporting raids on the Ottoman Empire by irregular troops. On one of these raids near the island of Leros, on 28 September, the commander of the destroyer, Commander H. T. England, was severely injured. The destroyer remained a member of the Fifth Destroyer Flotilla within the Mediterranean Fleet. Submarine warfare continued to grow and, by June 1917, the Germans were sinking 142,000 long tons (144,000 t) of shipping in a month. In response, the Admiralty started introducing convoys on major routes escorted by destroyers. By October, Harpy had been transferred to the Northern Division of the Coast of Ireland Station based at Buncrana. The destroyers at Buncrana assisted convoys travelling across the Atlantic Ocean to and from the American industrial complex at Hampton Roads and via Sydney, Nova Scotia, arriving and departing ports on the Clyde and Mersey. The division also provided three escorts every eight days to protect fast convoys travelling to and from Halifax, Nova Scotia. The vessel ended the war as a member of the Fourth Destroyer Flotilla based at Devonport.

After the Armistice that ended the war, the Royal Navy quickly withdrew all pre-war destroyers from active service. By February 1919, Harpy had been transferred to The Nore. However, that deployment did not last long. As the force returned to a peacetime level of strength, both the number of ships and personnel needed to be reduced to save money. Declared superfluous to operational requirements, Harpy was retired, and, on 27 November 1921, sold to Fryer of Sunderland to be broken up.

== Pennant numbers ==
Pennant numbers
Pennant number	Date
D88	February 1915
H19	January 1918
H71	June 1918
H32	January 1919
