= HMS Grasshopper (1909) =

Destroyer of the Royal Navy

History

United Kingdom
- Name: HMS Grasshopper
- Builder: Fairfield Shipbuilding & Engineering Company, Govan
- Laid down: 17 April 1909
- Launched: 23 November 1909
- Commissioned: July 1910
- Fate: Sold for breaking, November 1921

General characteristics
- Class & type: Beagle-class destroyer
- Displacement: 953 long tons (968 t)
- Length: 269 ft (82 m)
- Beam: 26 ft 7 in (8.10 m)
- Draught: 8 ft 6 in (2.59 m)
- Installed power: 12,500 hp (9,300 kW) under a forced draught
- Propulsion: 5 x Yarrow Coal-fired boilers, 3 x Parson's steam turbines driving 3 shafts
- Speed: 27 knots (50 km/h; 31 mph)
- Complement: 96
- Armament: 1 × 4-in (102 mm) /40 BL Mark VIII naval gun; 3 × QF 12 pdr 12 cwt Mark I; 2 × single 21 inch (533 mm) torpedo tubes

HMS Grasshopper was a Beagle-class (or G-class) destroyer of the British Royal Navy. The Beagles were coal-fuelled ships, designed for a speed of 27 kn (31 mph; 50 km/h), armed with a 4-inch (102 mm gun and two torpedo tubes. Grasshopper was built by Fairfield Shipbuilding & Engineering Company at their Govan yard, between 1909 and 1910, being launched on 23 November 1909 and completing in July 1910.

Grasshopper was transferred to the Mediterranean Fleet in 1913, and spent most of the First World War in the Mediterranean, taking part in the Gallipoli campaign, before returning to British waters in 1917. She was sold for scrap in November 1921.

== Construction and design ==
Grasshopper was one of three Beagle-class destroyers ordered from Fairfield Shipbuilding and Engineering Company as part of the 1908–1909 shipbuilding programme. The Beagles were not built to a standard design, with detailed design being left to the builders of individual ships in accordance with a loose specification.

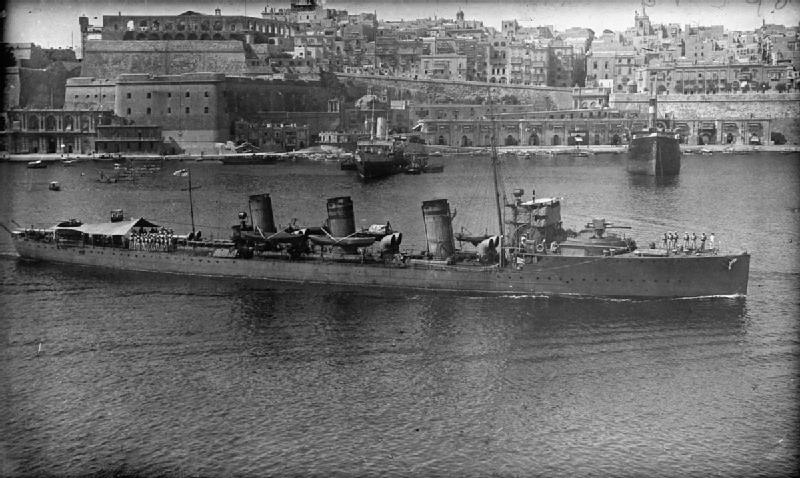
Sister-ship Scorpion

The three Fairfield ships were 271 feet (82.6 m) long, with a beam of 27.7 feet (8.4 m) and a draught of 8 feet 8 inches (2.6 m). Displacement was 923 long tons (938 t) normal. Five Yarrow boilers fed direct-drive Parsons steam turbines driving three propeller shafts. The machinery was rated at 12,000 shp (8,900 kW) giving a design speed of 27 kn (31 mph; 50 km/h). Gun armament consisted of one BL 4 inch naval gun Mk VIII and three QF 12-pounder 12 cwt guns. (Note: "Cwt" is the abbreviation for hundredweight, 12cwt referring to the weight of the gun.) Torpedo armament consisted of two 21 inch (533 mm) torpedo tubes. Two spare torpedoes were carried. The ship had a crew of 96 officers and men.

Grasshopper was laid down at Fairfield Shipbuilding and Engineering Company's Govan, Glasgow shipyard as Yard number 464 on 17 April 1909 and was launched on 23 November 1909. She reached a speed of 27.04 kn (31.12 mph; 50.08 km/h) during sea trials, and was completed in July 1910.

== Service ==
The Beagles joined the 1st and 2nd Destroyer Flotillas as they commissioned, with Grasshopper being a member of the 1st Flotilla. She was refitted at Chatham Dockyard in July–September 1911. In 1912, a reorganisation of the Home Fleet resulted in the Beagle's forming the 3rd Destroyer Flotilla. Grasshopper remained part of the 3rd Flotilla in March 1913. In October 1913, the Beagles, including Grasshopper, were moved to the Mediterranean as the newly formed 5th Destroyer Flotilla.

Grasshopper remained part of the 5th Flotilla on the eve of the outbreak of the First World War. With war clouds looming on 2 August 1914 the Fifth Destroyer Flotilla was involved in the search for Goeben and Breslau in the Mediterranean. On 3 August, the 3rd Division of the 5th Flotilla (Beagle, Bulldog, Grasshopper and Harpy) were at Malta and while it was initially planned that they reinforce Rear Admiral Ernest Troubridge's squadron patrolling the entrance to the Adriatic, Grasshopper, along with Harpy and Grampus, was ordered to patrol the southern end of the Straits of Messina on 7 October. The attempts to intercept Goeben and Breslau failed, and the two German ships reached Turkey on 10 August.

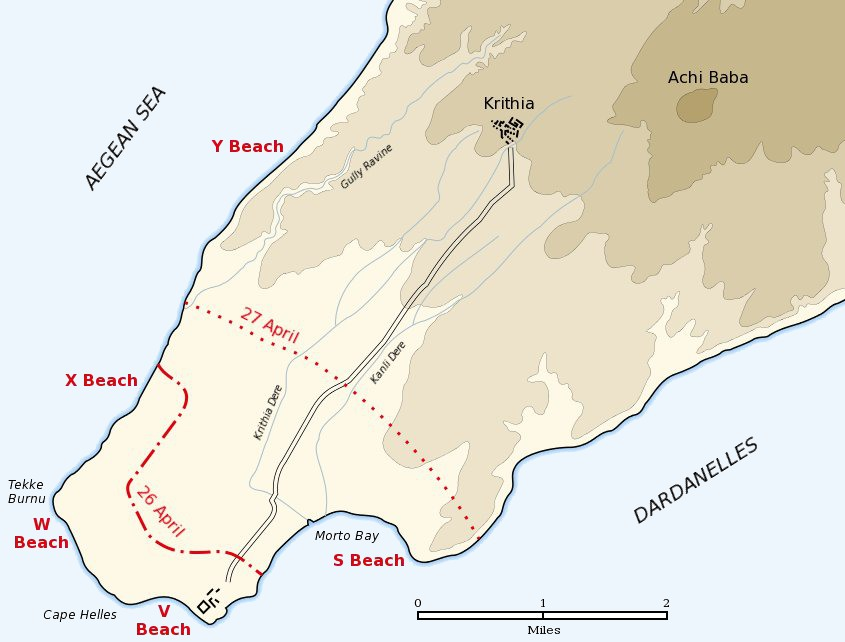
Map of the landing beaches on 25 April

In 1915 she took part in the naval operations in the Dardanelles campaign. On the night of 1/2 March 1915, Grasshopper, along with Basilisk, Mosquito and Racoon escorted trawlers attempting to clear the minefields across the narrows of the Dardanelles straits. The force came under heavy fire from Turkish guns, and were forced to turn back before reaching the minefields. Continued attempts to clear the minefields ay night proved unsuccessful, and it was decided to clear the minefields by day while the British and French battleships suppressed the Turkish guns that protected the minefields. This was attempted on 18 March, with Grasshopper, Basilisk, Mosquito and Racoon again escorting the minesweeping trawlers. The attempt failed, however, with the fire from mobile guns forcing the minesweepers to turn back, with the battleships Bouvet, Ocean and Irresistible sunk and the battleships Gaulois and Suffren and the battlecruiser Inflexible badly damaged.

On 25 April, Allied forces landed at Anzac Cove and Cape Helles on the Gallipoli peninsula. Grasshopper supported the landings at S Beach on Cape Helles on 25 April along with Basilisk and the battleships Lord Nelson and Cornwallis, and for the next few days swept mines inside the straits to allow battleships to support the landings. The British made another attempt to break the stalemate at Gallipoli on 6–7 August 1915, with the Landing at Suvla Bay, to the north of Anzac Cove. The troops were landed using armoured shallow-draught self-propelled landing craft known as "Beetles", which were towed close to shore by destroyers. Grasshopper took part in the main landing on Nibrunesi beach to the south of Suvla Bay, where two brigades (the 32nd and 33rd of the 11th Division) were landed. Each destroyer carried 500 troops aboard, while towing a "Beetle" carrying a further 500 troops. The "Beetles" landed their troops and then returned to pick up the remaining troops on the destroyers and land them. Grasshopper took part in the final evacuations from Gallipoli on 8/9 January 1916, picking up troops from V beach on Cape Helles.

Grasshopper was still based in the Mediterranean in August 1917, but by September had returned to Home waters, joining the 4th Destroyer Flotilla, based at Devonport, Plymouth. By October that year, she had moved to the 2nd Destroyer Flotilla, based at Buncrana in the north of Ireland. On 5 February 1918, Grasshopper was part of the escort for Convoy HX 20, bound from Halifax, Nova Scotia to Liverpool when the troopship Tuscania was torpedoed by the German submarine UB-77 south west of Islay. Grasshopper was one of three destroyers detached from the convoy to rescue survivors from the sinking troopship and rescued about 500 men, while Pigeon rescued about 800 and Mosquito about 200. 166 American soldiers and 44 members of Tuscania's crew were killed. Grasshopper was still part of the 2nd Flotilla in May 1918, but by July had returned to the 4th Flotilla at Devonport. She remained at Devonport at the end of the war in November 1918.

At the end of the war, all pre-war destroyers were quickly withdrawn from active service. By January 1919, Grasshopper was still at Devonport having left the 4th Flotilla, and by February had moved to The Nore. She was sold for scrap on 1 November 1921 to Fryer of Sunderland.

== Pennant numbers ==
Pennant number	Date
H17	January 1918
H60	June 1918
