= HMS Pincher (1910) =

Destroyer of the Royal Navy

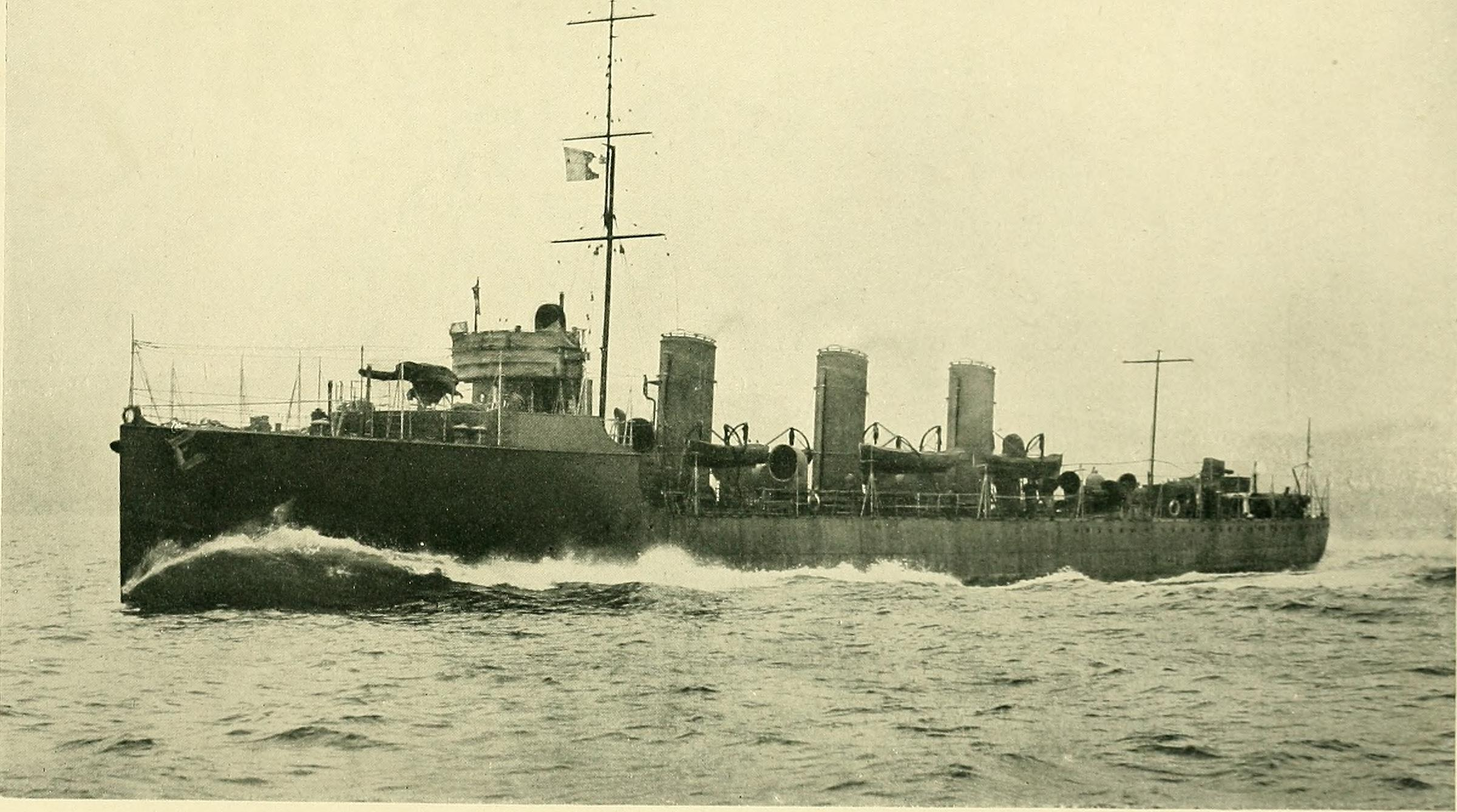
- HMS Pincher

History

United Kingdom
- Name: HMS Pincher
- Builder: William Denny and Brothers
- Launched: 15 March 1910
- Fate: Wrecked on 24 July 1918

General characteristics
- Class & type: Beagle-class destroyer
- Displacement: 975 tons
- Length: 274 ft (84 m)
- Beam: 28 ft (8.5 m)
- Draught: 10 ft (3.0 m)
- Installed power: 12,500 ihp (9,300 kW)
- Propulsion: Steam engine(s)
- Speed: 27 kn (50 km/h)
- Complement: 96
- Armament: 1 × BL 4 in (100 mm) Mk VIII gun; 3 × QF 12-pounder 12 cwt Mark I guns; 1 × 3-pounder anti-aircraft gun; 2 × 21 inch (533 mm) torpedo tubes

HMS Pincher was a coal-fired Beagle-class destroyer of the Royal Navy built by William Denny and Brothers and launched on 15 March 1910.

== Construction and design ==
Pincher was one of sixteen Beagle-class destroyers ordered under the 1908–1909 construction programme for the Royal Navy, and the only one of the class from the Scottish shipbuilder William Denny and Brothers . The Beagles were intended as a smaller and slower follow on to the previous Tribal class, which would be affordable enough to be built in large numbers. The use of coal as a fuel was ordered to reduce costs. The Beagles were not built to a standard design, with detailed design being left to the builders of individual ships in accordance with a loose specification.

Pincher was 271 feet 9 inches (82.83 m) long, with a beam of 28 feet 6 inches (8.69 m) and a draught of 8 feet 6 inches (2.59 m). Displacement was 940 long tons (960 t) normal. Five Yarrow boilers fed Parsons steam turbines rated at 12,500 shaft horsepower (9,300 kW), driving three shafts and giving a design speed of 27 knots (50 km/h; 31 mph). During sea trials she reached a speed of 27.17 knots (50.32 km/h; 31.27 mph).

The class had a gun armament of one BL 4 inch naval gun Mk VIII on the ships forecastle, and three QF 12-pounder 12 cwt guns. (Note: "Cwt" is the abbreviation for hundredweight, 12 cwt referring to the weight of the gun.) Torpedo armament consisted of two 21-inch (533 mm) torpedo tubes, with one between the ship's funnels and the aft gun, and one right aft at the stern of the ship. Two spare torpedoes were carried. The ships had a crew of 96 officers and men.

Pincher was laid down on 20 May 1909 at Denny's Dumbarton shipyard as Yard number 878 was launched on 15 March 1910, and completed on 2 September 1910.

== Service history ==
The Beagles joined the 1st and 2nd Destroyer Flotillas as they commissioned, but in 1912, a reorganisation of the Home Fleet resulted in the Beagle's forming the 3rd Destroyer Flotilla. Pincher remained part of the 3rd Flotilla in March 1913. In October 1913, the Beagles, including Pincher, were moved to the Mediterranean as the newly formed 5th Destroyer Flotilla.

Pincher was still part of the 5th Flotilla at the outbreak of the First World War. On the eve of war, the Mediterranean Fleet was deployed to find the German battlecruiser Goeben and cruiser Breslau. On the night of 5/6 August 1914, Pincher accompanied the battlecruisers Inflexible and Indefatigable and the cruisers Chatham and Weymouth as they patrolled west of Sicily, with Pincher putting into Bizerte on 6 August to coal and to take two captured German merchant ships, Kawak and Kalymnos into port.

In November 1914, as a response to a shortage of destroyers in home waters, Pincher was one of eight Beagle-class destroyers recalled to Britain, reaching Plymouth on 29 November, and being used to operate from Portsmouth, patrolling the routes used by cross-Channel transports. It had been planned to use the Beagles to equip a new Tenth Destroyer Flotilla based at Harwich, but the need for escorts for transports in the Channel led to these plans being abandoned, and the ships remained at Portsmouth.

On 26 March 1915, following the failure of attempts to force the Dardanelles had failed, these eight Beagles were ordered to rejoin the 5th Destroyer Flotilla Mudros for operations in support of the Dardanelles Campaign. During the initial landings at ANZAC Cove and at Cape Helles, Pincher joined several other destroyers in minesweeping operations in the Dardanelles straits to allow Allied battleships to bombard Turkish positions. On the night of 12/13 May, the pre-dreadnought battleships Goliath and Cornwallis were anchored in Morto Bay, supporting French troops. To protect the two battleships, Pincher patrolled the centre of the straits, Beagle and Bulldog patrolled the north side of the straits, with Scorpion and Wolverine patrolling the southern side. Despite these patrols, the Turkish destroyer Muavenet-i Milliye managed to sneak past Beagle and Bulldog on the northern side of the straits and torpedoed and sunk Goliath before successfully escaping. From March 1916, Pincher operated in the Aegean, patrolling the Dodecanese, Sporades and Cyclades and the Turkish coast.

Pincher remained with the 5th Flotilla until December 1917, but by 2 January 1918, she had returned to British waters, and was repairing at Pembroke Dock before joining the 2nd Destroyer Flotilla, operating with the Northern Division of the Coast of Ireland Station and based at Buncrana in the north of Ireland. By June 1918, Pincher had transferred to the 4th Destroyer Flotilla at Devonport.

On 24 July 1918, whilst escorting the Standard Tanker War Hostage from Devonport through the Western Approaches with Scorpion, Pincher took a course that brought her dangerously close to the Seven Stones Reef, between Cornwall and the Isles of Scilly (the reef that would claim the supertanker Torrey Canyon in 1967). Errors in navigation due to fog compounded the error and Pincher struck the reef at high speed. The impact tore open her hull and she sank at 03:33 hours. After the accident, her commander — Lieutenant Patrick W.R. Weir — was subjected to a court-martial, at which he was sentenced to be reprimanded for steering an unsafe course.
