= HMS Wolverine (1910) =

Destroyer of the Royal Navy

Coordinates: 55.166°N 8.685°W

- HMS Wolverine

History

United Kingdom
- Name: HMS Wolverine
- Builder: Cammell Laird, Birkenhead
- Launched: 15 January 1910
- Fate: Sunk in collision, 12 December 1917

General characteristics
- Class & type: Beagle-class destroyer
- Length: 274 ft (84 m)
- Beam: 28 ft (8.5 m)
- Draught: 10 ft (3.0 m)
- Installed power: 12,500 ihp (9,300 kW)
- Propulsion: Steam engines
- Speed: 27 knots (50 km/h; 31 mph)
- Complement: 96
- Armament: 1 × BL 4-inch (100 mm) L/40 Mark VIII guns; 3 × QF 12 pdr 12 cwt Mark I; 1 × 3-pounder anti-aircraft gun; 2 × 21 inch (533 mm) torpedo tubes

HMS Wolverine was a Beagle-class destroyer of the Royal Navy launched on 15 January 1910. She was built by Cammell Laird at Birkenhead.

== Design and construction ==
Wolverine was one of three Beagle-class destroyers ordered from the shipbuilder Cammell Laird as part of the 1908–1909 shipbuilding programme. The Beagles were not built to a standard design, with detailed design being left to the builders of individual ships in accordance with a loose specification. Wolverine, like the other two Laird-built ships, was 266 feet (81.1 m) long, with a beam of 28 feet (8.5 m) and a draught of 8 feet 8 inches (2.6 m). Displacement was 914 long tons (929 t) normal. Five Yarrow boilers fed direct-drive Parsons steam turbines driving three propeller shafts. The machinery was rated at 12,500 shaft horsepower (9,300 kW) to meet the design speed of 27 knots (50 km/h; 31 mph). Gun armament consisted of one BL 4 inch naval gun Mk VIII and three QF 12-pounder 12 cwt guns. (Note: "Cwt" is the abbreviation for hundredweight, 12cwt referring to the weight of the gun.) Torpedo armament consisted of two 21 inch (533 mm) torpedo tubes. Two spare torpedoes were carried.

Wolverine was laid down at Laird's Birkenhead shipyard on 26 April 1904 and was launched on 15 January 1910. She reached a speed of 27.1 knots (50.2 km/h; 31.2 mph) on her sea trials, meeting the contract requirement of 27 knots, and was completed in September 1910.

== Service history ==
On commissioning, Wolverine joined the First Destroyer Flotilla, part of the Home Fleet. In 1912, the Royal Navy's destroyer flotillas were re-organized, with the Beagles joining the Third Destroyer Flotilla. Wolverine remained part of the Third Flotilla until August 1913, but had transferred to the Fifth Destroyer Flotilla, part of the Royal Navy's Mediterranean Fleet by November that year.

At the outbreak of the First World War, Wolverine was still in the Mediterranean, as a member of the 5th Destroyer Flotilla. The flotilla, including Wolverine, was involved in the pursuit of the German battlecruiser Goeben. Wolverine was one of eight destroyers deployed by Rear Admiral Ernest Troubridge to assist his squadron of Armoured cruisers in stopping the German ships escaping to Austrian waters. When it was realised that Goeben and Breslau were not heading to Austria, Troubridge left these destroyers behind as they did not have sufficient coal left for a high speed pursuit, and set off southwards on the night of 6/7 August 1914 with his four Armoured cruisers. He called off his pursuit later that night because he could not intercept the German squadron until daylight, when Goeben's superior speed and armament would give the Germans a significant advantage. On 1 November 1914 she and the destroyer Scorpion sank a Turkish armed yacht, believed to be involved in minelaying operations, in the Gulf of Smyrna.

In 1915, along with numerous other Beagle, River and Laforey-class destroyers, she took part in the naval operations in the Dardanelles campaign. Early operations involved escorting trawlers when they attempted to sweep Turkish minefields in the narrows of the Dardanelles. During the initial landings at ANZAC Cove and at Cape Helles, Wolverine joined several other destroyers in minesweeping operations in the Dardanelles straits to allow Allied battleships to bombard Turkish positions. On 28 April, Wolverine was sweeping in conjunction with sister ship Racoon (the sweep wire was run between the two ships) when she was hit on the ship's bridge by a Turkish shell, which killed Commander Osmond J. Prentis, Wolverine' s captain and two more men. On the night of 12/13 May, the pre-dreadnought battleships Goliath and Cornwallis were anchored in Morto Bay, supporting French troops. To protect the two battleships, Beagle and Bulldog patrolled the north side of the straits, with Scorpion and Wolverine patrolling the southern side and Pincher in the centre of the straits. Despite these patrols, the Turkish destroyer Muavenet-i Milliye managed to sneak past Beagle and Bulldog on the northern side of the straits and torpedoed and sunk Goliath before successfully escaping. On releasing that Goliath had been torpedoed, Wolverine and Scorpion attempted to cut off the Turkish destroyer, but Muavenet-i Milliye evaded them.

Work included naval artillery support, particular at the Cape Helles beachhead. On 28 June Wolverine provided support for the advancing forces at the Battle of Gully Ravine, helping to break up a Turkish counter attack. She provided cover for the final evacuation from Cape Helles on the night of 8/9 January 1916. From March 1916, Wolverine operated in the Aegean, patrolling the Dodecanese, Sporades and Cyclades and the Turkish coast, carrying raiding parties of Greek and Cretan irregular troops commanded by the classical scholar John Myres which carried out cattle raids on the Turkish coast.

Wolverine was recalled to home waters and assigned to the 2nd Destroyer Flotilla now based at Buncrana, near Lough Swilly in the north of Ireland in October 1917. On 12 December 1917, Wolverine was part of an escort group on the way to rendezvous with a Britain-bound Atlantic convoy off the northwest coast of Ireland, when the force's senior officer, aboard Hardy ordered a course change. After carrying out the manoeuvre, Wolverine was rammed by the fleet sweeping sloop Rosemary, with the destroyer rolling over and sinking as a result of the damage received. Two of Wolverine's crew were killed. The collision was blamed on Rosemary's bridge crew, and in particular her officer of the watch, who had carried out the course change too early, and then reversed the manoeuvre, putting the sloop on collision course with the destroyer, with there being no time for successful evasive action.
