= HMS Renard (1909) =

Destroyer of the Royal Navy

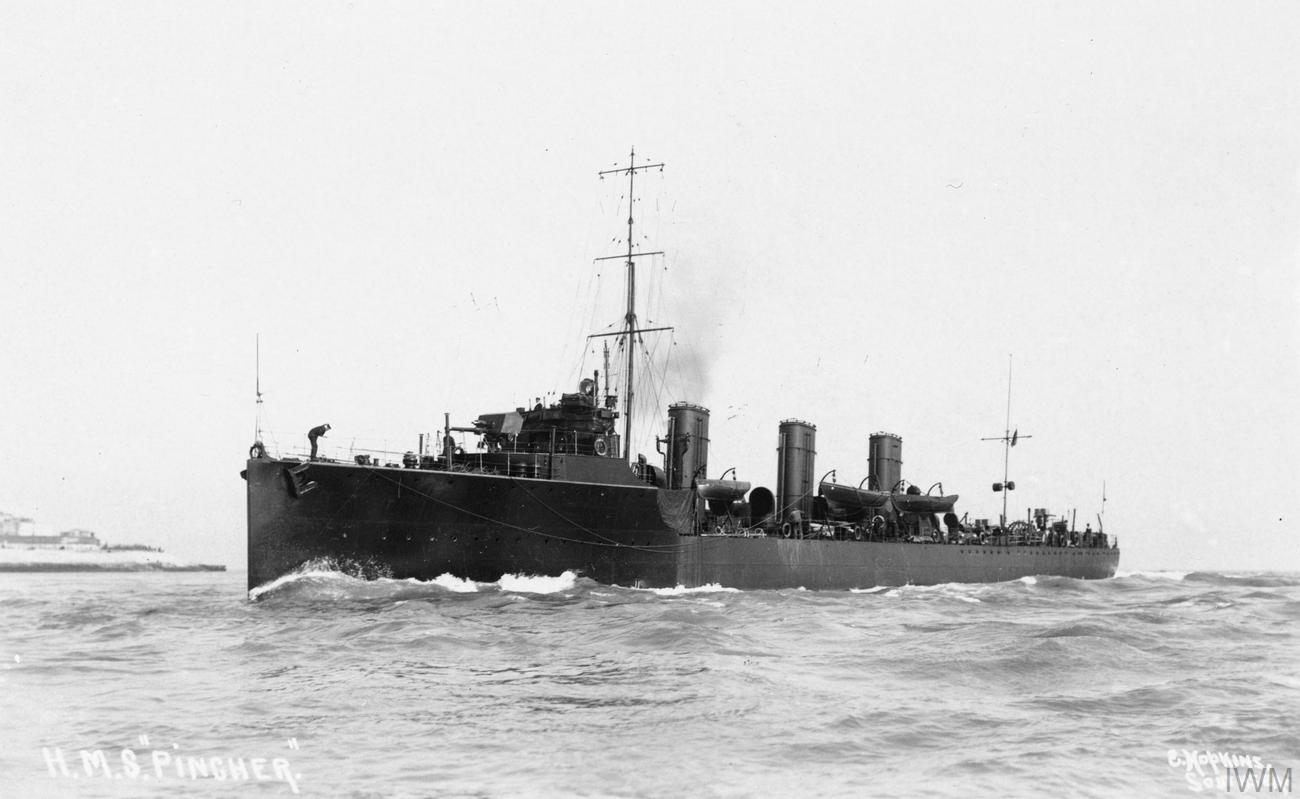
- Sister ship Pincher

History

United Kingdom
- Name: Renard
- Builder: Cammell Laird, Birkenhead
- Laid down: 20 April 1909
- Launched: 13 November 1909
- Completed: September 1910
- Out of service: 31 August 1920
- Fate: Sold to the broken up

General characteristics
- Class & type: Beagle-class destroyer
- Displacement: 918 long tons (933 t) (normal)
- Length: 266 ft 2 in (81.1 m)
- Beam: 28 ft 2 in (8.6 m)
- Draught: 16 ft 6 in (5 m)
- Installed power: 5 x coal-fired Yarrow boilers, 12,000 shp (8,900 kW)
- Propulsion: 3 x Parsons steam turbines driving 3 shafts
- Speed: 27 kn (50 km/h; 31 mph)
- Range: 2,000 nmi (3,700 km; 2,300 mi) at 15 knots (28 km/h; 17 mph)
- Complement: 96
- Armament: 1 × 4 in (102 mm) gun; 3 × 12 pdr 3 in (76 mm) guns; 2 × single 21 in (533 mm) torpedo tubes

HMS Renard was a Beagle-class (later G-class) destroyer of the British Royal Navy. The Beagles were coal-fuelled ships, designed for a speed of 27 kn (31 mph; 50 km/h) and armed with a 4 in (102 mm) gun and two torpedo tubes. Built by Cammell Laird and launched in 1909, Renard was initially commissioned into the First Destroyer Flotilla at Portsmouth. In 1912, the warship joined the Third Destroyer Flotilla before being transferred to the Mediterranean Fleet as part of the Fifth Destroyer Flotilla in 1913. As the First World War approached, the destroyer was based in Alexandria Egypt, but was swiftly redeployed to Malta, followed, in 1915, by action in the Dardanelles Campaign. While serving with the Eastern Mediterranean Squadron and its successor the Aegean Squadron, as well as undertaking escort duties, the destroyer supported sorties by irregular troops against the Ottoman Empire. After the Armistice of 1918 that ended the war, Renard was initially transferred to the Nore and then sold in 1920 to be broken up.

== Design and development ==
Renard was one of the Beagle-class destroyers ordered by the Admiralty as part of the 1908–1909 shipbuilding programme for the Royal Navy. The bridge was larger and higher than previous designs and the vessels were coal-burning after concerns had been raised about the availability of fuel oil in time of war. This reduced costs, although it also meant that five boilers were needed, the extra machinery meaning that there was less space on the deck for equipment. The Beagle class vessels were not built to a standard design, with detailed design being left to the builders of individual ships in accordance with a loose specification, in this case Cammell Laird. In October 1913, as part of a wider renaming of the Royal Navy's warships into classes named alphabetically, the class was renamed as the G-class.

Renard was 266 ft 2 in (81.1 m) long, with a beam of 28 ft 2 in (8.6 m) and a draught of 16 ft 6 in (5 m). Normal displacement was 918 long tons (933 t), which increased to 983 long tons (999 t) by the end of the First World War. Five Yarrow boilers fed direct-drive Parsons steam turbines driving three shafts. Two funnels were fitted. The machinery was rated at 12,000 shaft horsepower (8,900 kW) giving a design speed of 27 kn (31 mph; 50 km/h). During sea trials, the destroyer reached a speed of 27.145 kn (31.238 mph; 50.273 km/h) at a displacement of 912 long tons (927 t). Up to 226 long tons (230 t) of coal was carried, giving a design range of 2,000 nautical miles (3,700 km; 2,300 mi) at 15 knots (28 km/h; 17 mph). The ship had a complement of 96 officers and ratings.

Armament consisted of one 4 in (102 mm) BL Mk VIII gun forward and three 3 in (76 mm) QF 12-pounder 12 cwt guns aft. (Note: "Cwt" is the abbreviation for hundredweight, 12cwt referring to the weight of the gun.) Torpedo armament consisted of two 21 in (533 mm) torpedo tubes, one placed forward and the other aft. Two spare torpedoes were carried. On 8 April 1916, the Admiralty approved fitting the destroyer with depth charges. Two depth charge launchers and two charges were carried.

== Construction and career ==
Renard was laid down at Cammell Laird's Birkenhead shipyard on 20 April 1909, launched on 13 November and completed during September the following year. The ship was the tenth of the name to serve in the Royal Navy, named after the sloop Reynard, a prize captured from the French Navy. Renard was also occasionally known as Reynard. The vessel was commissioned at Portsmouth and joined the First Destroyer Flotilla on 20 October. On 15 November 1911, Renard towed her sister ship Scorpion to port after that vessel had been damaged in a collision with the Danish schooner Fyn. The accident happened when the First Flotilla was returning to Harwich after exercises in the English Channel. Scorpion was holed close to her engine room while Fyn sank.

In 1912, a reorganisation of the Home Fleet resulted in the ships of the Beagle class forming the Third Destroyer Flotilla. Renard was recommissioned at Sheerness on 3 September and joined the flotilla at Chatham. The vessel remained part of the Third Flotilla in March 1913. Along with the rest of the class,Renard was transferred to the newly-formed Fifth Destroyer Flotilla as part of the Mediterranean Fleet in November.

As the First World War approached, Renard was part of the First Division of the Fifth Flotilla and based in Alexandria. The destroyer sailed to Malta, joining the rest of the flotilla on 9 August. The island had a coal shortage, which restricted the vessel's activity. On 6 August 1914, the destroyer was deployed searching for the German warships Goeben and Breslau but this was curtailed by a lack of fuel. In 1915 Renard participated in the naval operations in the Dardanelles Campaign with the Eastern Mediterranean Squadron. The presence of large minefields across the narrows of the Dardanelles straits impeded the British and French forces attempting to assault the Ottoman forces. On 3 March, along with sister ships Grampus and Scorpion, the destroyer escorted trawlers attempting to clear the minefields. The following day saw the destroyer again join other members of the class in escorting the troopship Braemar Castle, carrying soldiers to land at Kumkale. On 25 and 26 June, the destroyer was one of five, including sister ship Rattlesnake, that undertook minesweeping in the Dardanelles. Despite heavy fire, the ships achieved their objective in what Rear Admiral John de Robeck, commander of the squadron, described as "a most satisfactory manner". At the end of the campaign, the destroyer helped in the evacuation of troops from Cape Helles.

Renard stayed with the Eastern Mediterranean Squadron into 1916. The year saw an intensification of submarine action by the Imperial German Navy in the Mediterranean Sea and an increasing demand on destroyers as escorts. In February alone, fifty ships, totalling 101,000 long tons (103,000 t), were lost. Due to a lack of resources, the destroyers in the Mediterranean Fleet could only escort high value ships, like troopships. The ship also saw other duties, including supporting raids on the Ottoman Empire. On 24 July, the destroyer, as part of a small detachment that also included the monitor M33 and a minesweeper, escorted 172 irregular troops on a raid near the cities of Mytilene and Smyrna, the current İzmir. Despite being bombed by an aircraft of the Ottoman Aviation Squadrons, they returned with 3,200 sheep and other animals.

The destroyer remained a member of the Fifth Destroyer Flotilla within the Mediterranean Fleet. As the following year opened, the need for destroyer escorts increased dramatically as the German navy introduced unrestricted submarine warfare. By June, the submarines were sinking 142,338 long tons (144,622 t) of shipping a month. In response, the Admiralty introduced convoys on major routes, including those between Malta and Egypt, although Renard was still called upon to escort occasional single high-value ships as well. On 20 January the following year, Renard accompanied the Acheron-class destroyer Archer escorting a tanker. At this point, the destroyer was deployed as part of the Second Detached Squadron of the squadron, now renamed the Aegean Squadron, based at Pyrgos on the island of Imbros.

After the Armistice of 11 November 1918 that ended the war, the Royal Navy quickly withdrew all pre-war destroyers from active service. By February 1919, Renard had been transferred to the Nore. However, that deployment did not last long. As the force returned to a peacetime level of strength, both the number of ships and personnel needed to be reduced to save money. Declared superfluous to operational requirements, Renard was retired, and, on 31 August 1920, sold to Ward at New Holland to be broken up.

== Pennant numbers ==
Pennant numbers
Pennant number	Date
H99	January 1918
H27	January 1919
