= H32 =

H32 may refer to:

- HMS H32, a Royal Navy H class submarine
- HMS Harpy (H32), a Royal Navy Beagle-class destroyer
- HMS Havant (H32), a Royal Navy H class destroyer
- HMS Rapid (H32), a Royal Navy R-class destroyer
- London Buses route H32, a Transport for London contracted bus route
