= Beagle-class destroyer =

1910 class of British destroyers

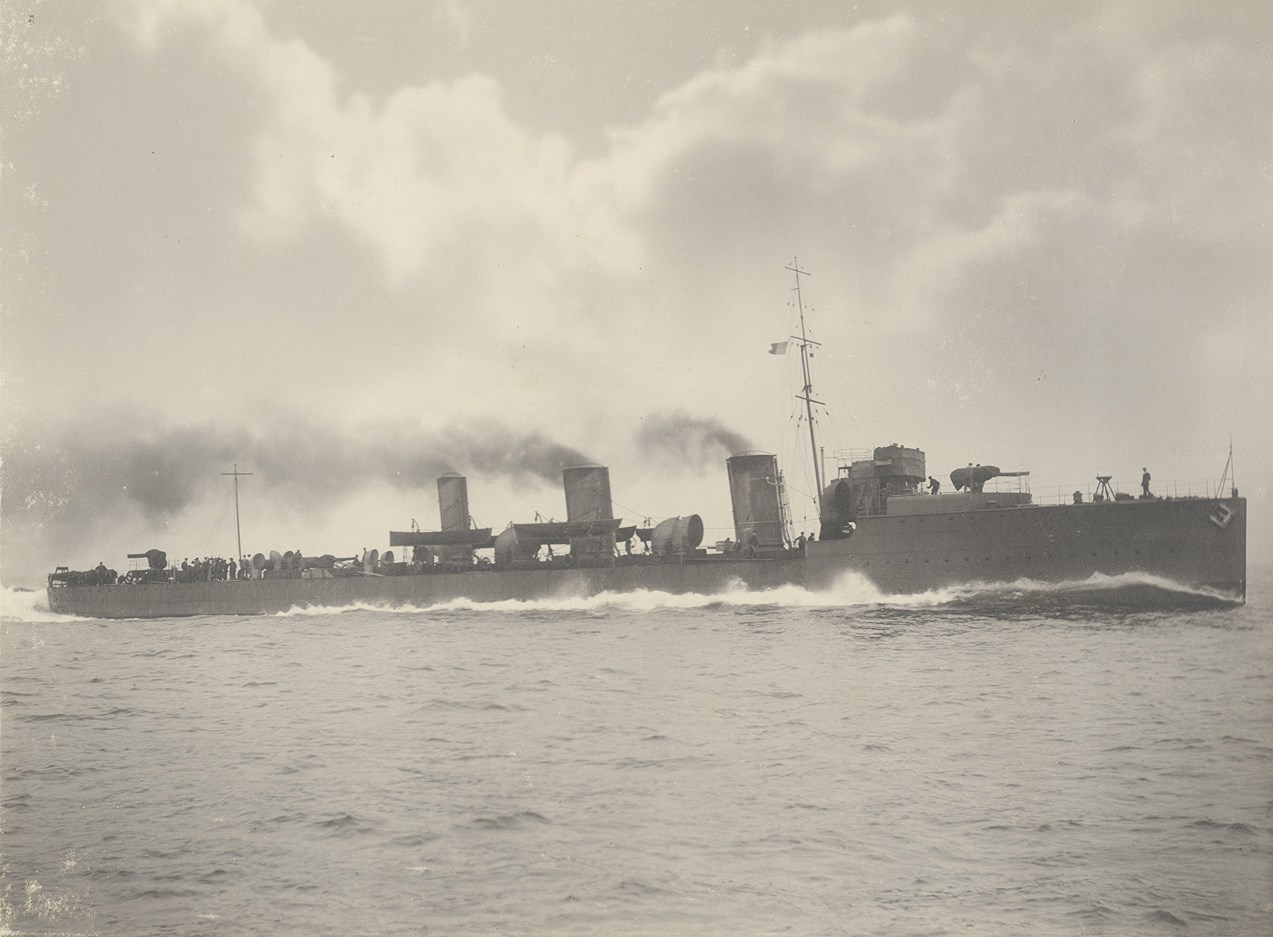
- HMS Scourge at sea, 1914

Class overview
- Name: Beagle class (or G class)
- Builders: John Brown & Company; J. Samuel White & Company; Fairfield Shipbuilding & Engineering Company; Thames Ironworks and Shipbuilding Company; William Denny & Brothers; Cammell Laird & Company; Harland & Wolff; R. W. Hawthorn Leslie & Company; John I. Thornycroft & Company
- Operators: Royal Navy
- Preceded by: Tribal class
- Succeeded by: Acorn class
- Built: 1909 – 1910
- In commission: 1910 – 1921
- Completed: 16
- Lost: 3
- Scrapped: 13

General characteristics
- Type: Destroyer
- Displacement: 860–940 long tons (874–955 t)
- Length: 275 ft (83.8 m)
- Beam: 27 ft 6 in (8.38 m)
- Draught: 8 ft 6 in (2.59 m)
- Installed power: Coal-fired boilers; 12,500 shp (9,300 kW)
- Propulsion: 2 or 3 shafts; direct-drive steam turbines
- Speed: 27 knots (50.0 km/h; 31.1 mph)
- Complement: 96
- Armament: 1 × single 4-inch (102 mm) gun; 3 × single 12 pdr (3 in (76 mm)) guns; 2 × single 21 in (533 mm) torpedo tubes

The Beagle class (officially redesignated as the G class in 1913) was a class of sixteen destroyers of the Royal Navy, all ordered under the 1908-1909 programme and launched in 1909 and 1910. The Beagles served during World War I, particularly during the Dardanelles Campaign of 1915.

== Design ==
For the 1908–1909 shipbuilding programme, the British Admiralty decided to revert to a smaller, more affordable destroyer to follow-on from the large and fast Tribal class (required to reach 33 knots (61 km/h; 38 mph)) and the experimental 36-knot (67 km/h; 41 mph) HMS Swift. The destroyers needed sufficient range to operate across the North Sea in the event of a confrontation with Germany, which rendered the Cricket-class coastal destroyers which had been built as a low-cost supplement to the expensive Tribals outdated, requiring larger numbers of a cheaper standard destroyer. While the Tribals were oil fuelled, it was decided to return to the use of coal for the new destroyers, because of concerns over the availability of oil stocks in the event of a war and to reduce costs. They were the last British destroyers to be so fueled.

The Beagles were not built to a standard design, with detailed design being left to the builders of individual ships in accordance with a loose specification. They were between 263 feet 11 1/4 inches (80.45 m) and 275 feet (83.82 m) long between perpendiculars, with a beam of between 26 feet 10 inches (8.18 m) and 28 feet 1 inch (8.56 m), with an average draught of 8 feet 6 inches (2.59 m). It was expected that the ships would displace 850 long tons (860 t) but the builder's designs came out heavier, at about 945 long tons (960 t) normal and 1,100 long tons (1,120 t) full load. Five Yarrow or White-Forster boilers fed direct-drive steam turbines driving three propeller shafts. The machinery was rated at 14,300 shaft horsepower (10,700 kW) to give a speed of 27 knots (50 km/h; 31 mph). Three funnels were fitted.

The Beagle class was designed to carry a gun armament of five 12-pounder (76 mm) guns, with two mounted side by side on a raised platform on the ship's forecastle, two on the ship's beams, with the port gun mounted ahead of the starboard gun and one aft. While the ships were building, however, it was decided to replace the two forecastle guns by a single 4-inch (102 mm) gun, (Note: This was as a result of tests 1906 against the destroyer Skate, which had shown that 12-pounder shells often exploded before they hit the target's engine room.) giving a gun armament of one BL 4 inch naval gun Mk VIII and three QF 12-pounder 12 cwt guns) (Note: "Cwt" is the abbreviation for hundredweight, 12 cwt referring to the weight of the gun.) Torpedo armament consisted of two 21-inch (533 mm) torpedo tubes, with one between the ship's funnels and the aft gun, and one right aft at the stern of the ship. These torpedoes had a range of 1,000 yards (910 m) at 50 knots (93 km/h; 58 mph) or 12,000 yards (11,000 m) at 30 knots (56 km/h; 35 mph). Two spare torpedoes were carried.

Wartime modifications included replacement of the aft torpedo tube by a 3-pounder (47 mm) anti-aircraft gun in some ships, while depth charges were also fitted.

The Beagles were followed, in the 1909–10 Programme, by the Acorn class (later known as the H class).

== Service ==
As the Beagles completed in 1910, they joined the 1st Destroyer Flotilla of the Royal Navy's Home Fleet. but in 1913 they were sent to the Mediterranean, where they formed the 5th Flotilla, remaining there on the outbreak of the First World War. They were officially redesignated the G class in October 1913 as part of a general re-designation of the Royal Navy's destroyers. The Beagle class spent most of the war in the Mediterranean, with several taking part in the Dardanelles Campaign. Late in 1917, the ships of the class were recalled to British waters, where three ships were lost to accidents, two by running aground and one to collision.

Being coal-fired, they were obsolete by the end of the First World War and the surviving ships were all scrapped by the end of 1921.

== Ships ==
Name	Builder	Laid down	Launch date	Completed	Fate
Beagle	John Brown and Company, Clydebank	17 March 1909	16 October 1909	June 1910.	Sold for breaking up 1 November 1921.
Bulldog	John Brown and Company, Clydebank	30 March 1909	13 November 1909,	7 July 1910.	Sold for breaking up 21 September 1920.
Foxhound	John Brown and Company, Clydebank	1 April 1909	11 December 1909	September 1910.	Sold for breaking up 1 November 1921.
Pincher	William Denny & Brothers, Dumbarton	20 May 1909	15 March 1910	September 1910.	Wrecked on Seven Stones reef, Land's End 24 July 1918.
Grasshopper	Fairfield Shipbuilding & Engineering Company, Govan	17 April 1909	23 November 1909	July 1910.	Sold for breaking up 1 November 1921.
Mosquito	Fairfield Shipbuilding & Engineering Company, Govan	22 April 1909	27 January 1910	August 1910.	Sold for breaking up 31 August 1920.
Scorpion	Fairfield Shipbuilding & Engineering Company, Govan	3 May 1909	19 February 1910	September 1910.	Sold for breaking up 26 October 1921.
Scourge	R. W. Hawthorn Leslie & Company, Hebburn	9 March 1909	11 February 1910	August 1910.	Sold for breaking up 9 May 1921.
Racoon	Cammell Laird & Company, Birkenhead	1 May 1909	15 February 1910	October 1910.	Wrecked on Irish coast 9 January 1918 during blizzard.
Renard	Cammell Laird & Company, Birkenhead	20 April 1909	13 November 1909	September 1910.	Sold for breaking up 31 August 1920.
Wolverine	Cammell Laird & Company, Birkenhead	26 April 1909	15 January 1910	September 1910.	Sunk in collision with the sloop Rosemary in Lough Foyle 12 December 1917.
Rattlesnake	Harland & Wolff, Glasgow	29 April 1909	14 March 1910	September 1910.	Sold for breaking up 9 May 1921.
Nautilus	Thames Ironworks and Shipbuilding Company, Bow Creek	14 April 1909	30 March 1910	September 1911.	The ship was renamed Grampus on 16 December 1913, (Note: While Friedman and Conway's list the ship as having been renamed on 16 December 1912, the ship remained listed under her original name in the March 1913 issue of The Navy List, not being noted as having been renamed until the January 1914 edition.) freeing up the original name for a submarine. Sold for breaking up 21 September 1920.
Savage	John I. Thornycroft & Company, Woolston	2 March 1909	10 March 1910	August 1910.	Sold for breaking up 9 May 1921.
Basilisk	J. Samuel White & Company, Cowes	11 May 1909	9 February 1910	September 1910.	Sold for breaking up 1 November 1921.
Harpy	J. Samuel White & Company, Cowes	23 April 1909	27 November 1909	July 1910.	Sold for breaking up 1 November 1921.

== Bibliography ==
- Brown, David K. (2010). The Grand Fleet: Warship Design and Development 1906–1922. Seaforth Publishing. ISBN 978-1-84832-085-7.
- Colledge, J. J.; Warlow, Ben (2006) [1969]. Ships of the Royal Navy: The Complete Record of All Fighting Ships of the Royal Navy from the 15th Century to the Present (3rd Rev ed.). London: Chatham Publishing. ISBN 978-1-86176-281-8. OCLC 67375475.
- Dittmar, F. J. & Colledge, J.J. (1972). British Warships 1914–1919. Ian Allan. ISBN 0-7110-0380-7.
- Friedman, Norman (2009). British Destroyers: From Earliest Days to the Second World War. Seaforth Publishing. ISBN 978-1-84832-049-9.
- Manning, T.D. (1961). The British Destroyer. Putnam. OCLC 6470051.

March, Edgar J. (1966). British Destroyers: A History of Development, 1892–1953; Drawn by Admiralty Permission From Official Records & Returns, Ships' Covers & Building Plans. Seeley Service. OCLC 164893555.

- Moore, John (1990). Jane's Fighting Ships of World War I. Studio. ISBN 1-85170-378-0.
- Preston, Antony (1985). "Great Britain and Empire Forces". In Gray, Randal (ed.). Conway's All the World's Fighting Ships 1906–1921. Naval Institute Press. pp. 1–104. ISBN 0-85177-245-5.
