= HMS Foxhound (1909) =

Destroyer of the Royal Navy

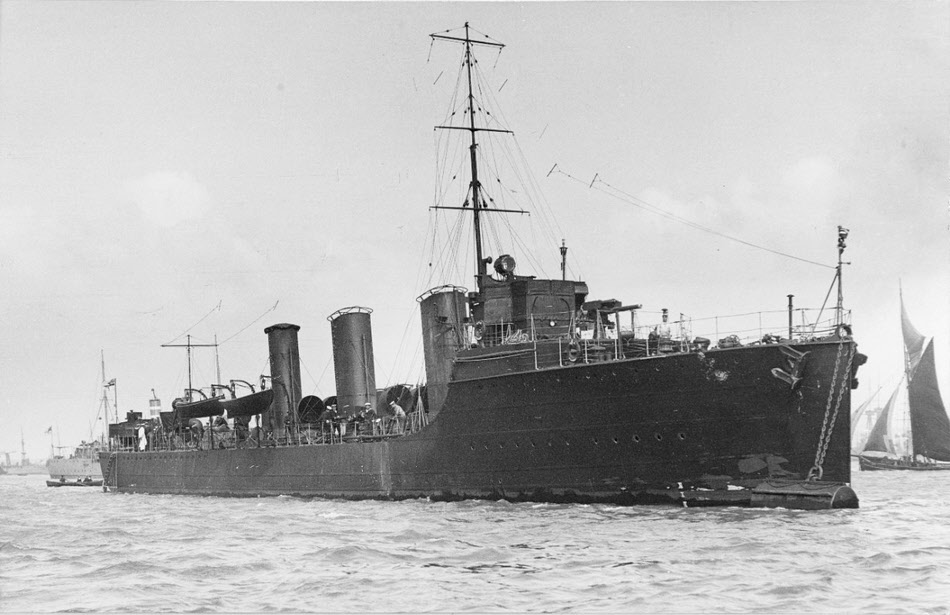
- HMS Foxhound moored to a buoy

History

United Kingdom
- Name: HMS Foxhound
- Builder: John Brown & Company, Clydebank
- Laid down: 1 April 1909
- Launched: 11 December 1909
- Commissioned: September 1910
- Honours and awards: Dardanelles 1915–1916
- Fate: Sold for breaking, 1 November 1921

General characteristics
- Class & type: Beagle-class destroyer
- Displacement: 953 long tons (968 t)
- Length: 269 ft (82 m)
- Beam: 26 ft 7 in (8.10 m)
- Draught: 8 ft 6 in (2.59 m)
- Installed power: 12,500 hp (9,300 kW) under a forced draught
- Propulsion: 5 x Yarrow Coal-fired boilers, 3 x Parson's steam turbines driving 3 shafts
- Speed: 27 knots (50 km/h; 31 mph)
- Complement: 96
- Armament: 1 × 4-in (102 mm) /40 BL Mark VIII naval gun; 3 × QF 12 pdr 12 cwt Mark I; 2 × single 21 inch (533 mm) torpedo tubes

HMS Foxhound was a Beagle-class (or G-class) destroyer of the British Royal Navy. The Beagles were coal-fuelled ships, designed for a speed of 27 kn (31 mph; 50 km/h), armed with a 4-inch (102 mm) gun and two torpedo tubes. Foxhound was built by John Brown & Company at their Clydebank yard, between 1909 and 1910, being launched on 11 December 1909 and completing in August 1910.

== Construction and design ==
Foxhound was one of three Beagle-class destroyers ordered from the Scottish shipbuilder John Brown & Company under the 1908–1909 construction programme for the Royal Navy, with a total of 16 ships ordered from 9 shipbuilders. The Beagles were intended as a smaller and slower follow on to the previous Tribal class, which would be affordable enough to be built in large numbers. The use of coal as a fuel was ordered to reduce costs. The Beagles were not built to a standard design, with detailed design being left to the builders of individual ships in accordance with a loose specification.

Foxhound was 269 feet (82.0 m) long between perpendiculars, with a beam of 26 feet 7 inches (8.10 m) and a draught of 8 feet 6 inches (2.59 m). Displacement was 953 long tons (968 t) normal. Five Yarrow boilers fed steam at 220 pounds per square inch (1,500 kPa) to Parsons steam turbines rated at 12,500 shaft horsepower (9,300 kW), driving three shafts and giving a design speed of 27 knots (50 km/h; 31 mph). During sea trials she reached a speed of 27.7 knots (51.3 km/h; 31.9 mph).

The class had a gun armament of one BL 4 inch naval gun Mk VIII on the ships forecastle, and three QF 12-pounder 12 cwt guns, (Note: "Cwt" is the abbreviation for hundredweight, 12 cwt referring to the weight of the gun.) Torpedo armament consisted of two 21-inch (533 mm) torpedo tubes, with one between the ship's funnels and the aft gun, and one right aft at the stern of the ship. Two spare torpedoes were carried. The ships had a crew of 96 officers and men.

Foxhound was laid down on 1 April 1909 at John Brown's Clydebank shipyard as Yard number 389, was launched on 11 December 1909 and commissioned in September 1910.

== Service ==
The Beagles joined the 1st and 2nd Destroyer Flotillas as they commissioned, but in 1912, a reorganisation of the Home Fleet resulted in the Beagle's forming the 3rd Destroyer Flotilla. Foxhound remained part of the 3rd Flotilla in March 1913. In October 1913, the Beagles, including Foxhound, were moved to the Mediterranean as the newly formed 5th Destroyer Flotilla along with the depot ship Blenheim.

Foxhound, part of the 2nd Division of the 5th Flotilla, was docked at Malta on 27 July 1914, On 2 August, with war looming, the 1st and 2nd Divisions were deployed by Rear Admiral Ernest Troubridge to the entrance to the Adriatic to assist his squadron of Armoured cruisers to prevent the German battlecruiser Goeben and cruiser Breslau from escaping to Austrian waters. Britain declared war with Germany on 4 August, and when Goeben and Breslau were sighted by the cruiser Gloucester on 6 August, Troubridge left the destroyers, including Foxhound behind as they did not have sufficient coal left for a high speed pursuit, and set off southwards on the night of 6/7 August 1914 with his four Armoured cruisers. He called off his pursuit later that night because he could not intercept the German squadron until daylight, when Goeben's superior speed and armament would give the Germans a significant advantage. On 18 August, Foxhound was one of four destroyers ordered to Egypt on 18 August to guard against possible Turkish actions, with Foxhound patrolling the entrance to the Gulf of Aqaba in the Red Sea from 23 October. Foxhound left Egyptian waters on 21 November to join the forces patrolling off the Dardanelles.

Foxhound took part in the Gallipoli campaign, and on 25 April 1915, during the Landing at Anzac Cove landed troops from the 10th Battalion (Australia) using rowing boats. The British made another attempt to break the stalemate at Gallipoli on 6–7 August 1915, with the Landing at Suvla Bay, to the north of Anzac Cove. This time, instead of row-boats, armoured shallow-draught self-propelled landing craft known as "Beetles" were used, which were towed close to shore by destroyers. Foxhound took part in the main landing took place on Nibrunesi beach to the south of Suvla Bay, where two brigades (the 32nd and 33rd) of the 11th Division were landed. Each destroyer carried 500 troops aboard, while towing a "Beetle" carrying a further 500 troops. The "Beetles" would land their troops and then return to pick up the remaining troops on the destroyers and land them. After landing her troops, Foxhound supported advancing troops, including supplying them with drinking water. On 21 November 1916 she rescued some of the survivors of HMHS Britannic, sister ship of RMS Titanic.

Foxhound was still based in the Mediterranean in August 1917, but by October had returned to Home waters, joining the 2nd Destroyer Flotilla, based at Buncrana, near Lough Swilly in the north of Ireland. Foxhound remained based at Buncrana in April 1918, but by June, Foxhound had joined the 4th Destroyer Flotilla, based at Devonport, Plymouth. In July 1918, Foxhound took part in an operation to intercept a German cruiser submarine reported by intelligence to be returning to Germany. Foxhound led one of five divisions of hydrophone-equipped trawlers deployed between the Faroe Islands and Shetland. While two of the other divisions detected signs of a submarine, and the destroyer Beagle dropped several depth charges, the submarine escaped the hunting force. Foxhound remained part of the 4th Flotilla in August 1918, but by the end of the war in November 1918, was back in the 2nd Flotilla at Buncrana.

At the end of the war, all pre-war destroyers were quickly withdrawn from active service. Foxhound was listed as being at The Nore in January 1919, and by July was listed as in reserve. She was sold for scrap on 1 November 1921 to Fryer of Sunderland.

== Pennant numbers ==
Pennant number	Date
H16	January 1918
H58	April 1918
