= H-58 =

H-58 may refer to:

- H-58 (Michigan county highway)
- H-58 Kiowa or Bell OH-58 Kiowa, a helicopter
- HMS Foxhound (H58), a Royal Navy destroyer
