= HMS Racoon (1910) =

Destroyer of the Royal Navy

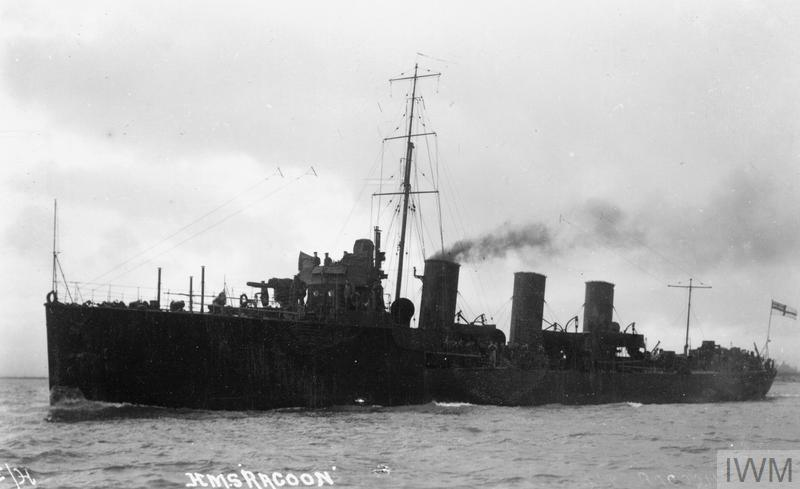
- Racoon

History

United Kingdom
- Name: Racoon
- Namesake: Racoon
- Builder: Cammell Laird, Birkenhead
- Laid down: 1 May 1909
- Launched: 15 February 1910
- Completed: October 1910
- Out of service: 9 January 1918
- Fate: Wrecked off the coast of Ireland

General characteristics
- Class & type: Beagle-class destroyer
- Displacement: 913 long tons (928 t) (normal)
- Length: 266 ft 2 in (81.1 m)
- Beam: 28 ft 2 in (8.6 m)
- Draught: 16 ft 6 in (5.0 m)
- Installed power: 5 x coal-fired Yarrow boilers, 12,000 shp (8,900 kW)
- Propulsion: 3 x Parsons steam turbines driving 3 shafts
- Speed: 27 kn (50 km/h; 31 mph)
- Range: 2,000 nmi (3,700 km; 2,300 mi) at 15 knots (28 km/h; 17 mph)
- Complement: 96
- Armament: 1 × 4 in (102 mm) gun; 3 × 12 pdr 3 in (76 mm) guns; 2 × single 21 in (533 mm) torpedo tubes

HMS Racoon was a Beagle-class (or G-class) destroyer of the British Royal Navy. The Beagles were coal-fuelled ships, designed for a speed of 27 kn (31 mph; 50 km/h) and armed with a 4 in (102 mm) gun and two torpedo tubes. Built by Harland & Wolff and launched in 1910, Racoon was transferred to the Mediterranean Fleet in 1913. In the run up to the First World War, the destroyer was deployed to Durazzo to observe the situation in Albania, but was swiftly redeployed back to Malta. The vessel was sent to protect shipping in the Suez Canal and Red Sea. In 1915, the destroyer served in the Dardanelles Campaign, escorting pre-dreadnought battleships attacking Ottoman defences and minesweepers that were attempting to clear the Dardanelles straits. During these operations, Racoon was damaged while assisting the stricken battleship Irresistible, which subsequently sank. Racoon also supported the Battle of Gully Ravine and landing at Suvla Bay. In 1917, the destroyer was transferred to Buncrana in the north of Ireland and served as a convoy escort against German submarines. Racoon was wrecked during a snowstorm off the Irish coast in 1918.

== Design and development ==
Racoon was one of the Beagle-class destroyers ordered as part of the 1908–1909 shipbuilding programme. The vessels were coal-burning after concerns had been raised about the availability of fuel oil in time of war and the bridge was larger and higher than previous designs. This reduced costs, although it also meant that five boilers were needed, the extra machinery meaning that deck space became more premium. Otherwise, the Beagle class vessels were not built to a standard design, with detailed design being left to the builders of individual ships in accordance with a loose specification. The vessels were known as the G class from October 1913 as part of a wider renaming of the Royal Navy's warships into classes named alphabetically, although they did not change their names. It was not until the introduction of the L- or Laforey class that the destroyers' names matched the class designation.

Racoon was 266 feet 2 inches (81.1 m) long, with a beam of 28 feet 2 inches (8.6 m) and a draught of 16 feet 6 inches (5 m). Normal displacement was 913 long tons (928 t), which increased to 983 long tons (999 t) by the end of the First World War. Five Yarrow boilers fed direct-drive Parsons steam turbines driving three shafts. Two funnels were fitted. The machinery was rated at 12,000 shaft horsepower (8,900 kW) giving a design speed of 27 kn (31 mph; 50 km/h). During sea trials, the destroyer reached a speed of 27.141 kn (31.233 mph; 50.265 km/h) at a power output of 13,627 shp (10,162 kW) and displacement of 923 long tons (938 t). Up to 226 long tons (230 t) of coal was carried, giving a design range of 2,000 nautical miles (3,700 km; 2,300 mi) at 15 knots (28 km/h; 17 mph). The ship had a complement of 96 officers and ratings.

Armament consisted of one 4 in (102 mm) BL Mk VIII gun forward and three 3 in (76 mm) QF 12-pounder 12 cwt guns aft. (Note: "Cwt" is the abbreviation for hundredweight, 12cwt referring to the weight of the gun.) Torpedo armament consisted of two 21 in (533 mm) torpedo tubes, one placed forward and the other aft. Two spare torpedoes were carried. On 8 April 1916, the Admiralty approved fitting the destroyer with depth charges. Two depth charge launchers and two charges were carried.

== Construction and career ==
Racoon was laid down at Cammell Laird's Birkenhead shipyard on 9 April 1909, was launched on 14 March the following year and completed during October. The ship was the sixth of the name to serve in the Royal Navy. The vessel was commissioned at Portsmouth and joined the First Destroyer Flotilla. During the following year, the destroyer was deployed to Malta, arriving on 14 March. In 1912, a reorganisation of the Home Fleet resulted in the ships of the Beagle class forming the Third Destroyer Flotilla. Racoon was recommissioned at Sheerness on 12 January and joined the flotilla at Harwich. The vessel remained part of the Third Flotilla in March 1913. Racoon subsequently joined the Fifth Destroyer Flotilla as part of the Mediterranean Fleet.

As the First World War approached, Racoon was part of the Fourth Division of the Fifth Flotilla and based in Durazzo. Along with the armoured cruiser Defence, the destroyer was part of an international squadron under Rear Admiral Ernest Troubridge monitoring Albania, where the new German ruler, Wilhelm, Prince of Albania, was under threat from internal factions wishing to depose him. The two ships sailed to Malta, joining the rest of the flotilla on 29 July. The island had a coal shortage, which restricted the vessel's activity. On 6 August 1914, the destroyer was deployed searching for the German warships Goeben and Breslau but this was curtailed by a lack of fuel. On 13 August, the destroyer was deployed to Suez to deter the Ottoman Empire from restricting British access to the Suez Canal. The ship subsequently joined the force based in the Suez Canal and Red Sea to protect the sea lane for Allied shipping. Duties varied and included escorting the ex-Union-Castle Line ship Grantully Castle carrying the Suffolk Regiment from Alexandria to Malta on 9 October. Two weeks later, on 25 October, the destroyer was in the Gulf of Suez searching for mines.

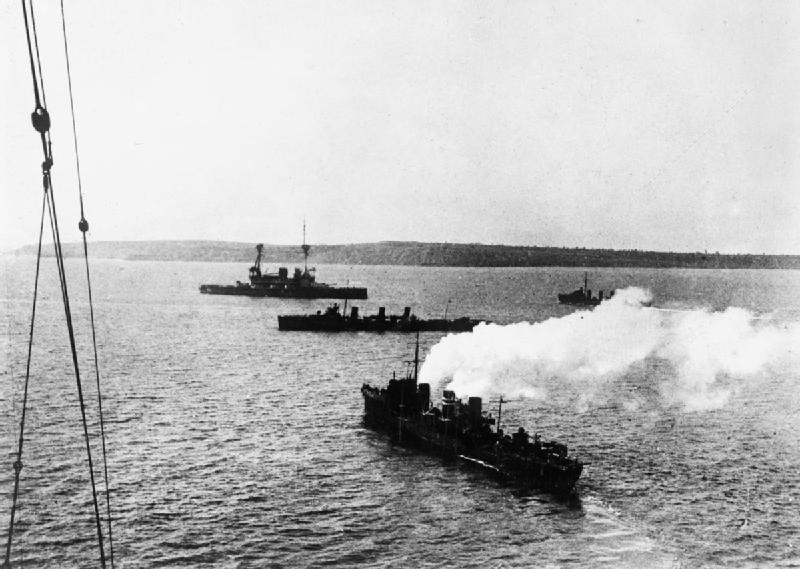
Racoon (foreground) off Dardanelles during the Gallipoli campaign

On 19 November, Racoon sailed for Tenedos and spent the next year supporting the naval operations in the Dardanelles Campaign. In preparation for the assault, the Admiralty decided to attack the defences on the Dardanelles strait with the pre-dreadnought battleships Albion, Majestic and Triumph. The attack was largely ineffective as the troops moved the batteries so they were safe from bombardment. On 26 February, Racoon, alongside sister ship Basilisk, escorted the battleships Cornwallis, Irresistible and Vengeance as they attempted to land parties to attack the batteries. This was also largely ineffective and also exposed the force to the presence of large minefields across the narrows of the Dardanelles straits. On the night of 1/2 March, along with sister ships Basilisk, Grasshopper and Mosquito, the destroyer escorted trawlers attempting to clear the minefields. The force came under heavy fire from Turkish guns, and were forced to turn back before reaching the minefields.

On the night of 17/18 March, the destroyer was involved in another attempt to clear the mines, this time escorting three trawlers and two picket boats. Once again, they had to turn back under heavy fire. It was then decided to clear the minefields by day while the British and French battleships suppressed the Turkish guns that protected the minefields. This was attempted on the following day, with Basilisk, Grasshopper, Mosquito and Racoon again escorting the minesweeping trawlers. The attempt failed, however, with the fire from mobile guns forcing the minesweepers to turn back. Even more consequentially, the battleships Bouvet, Ocean and Irresistible hit mines and sank. Racoon was also damaged by a mine or shell while attempting to rescue the crew of Irresistible, but managed to avoid sinking. Once repaired, the destroyer returned on 28 June to escort the protected cruiser Talbot shelling Ottoman positions in support of the Lowland Division during the Battle of Gully Ravine. On 6 August, the ship carried troops of the IX Corps to their landing at Suvla Bay.

The following year saw Racooon still a member of the Fifth Destroyer Flotilla within the Mediterranean Fleet. The year saw an intensification of submarine action by the Imperial German Navy in the Mediterranean Sea. In February alone, fifty ships, totalling 101,000 long tons (103,000 t), were lost. Due to a lack of resources, the destroyers in the Mediterranean Fleet could only escort high value ships, like troopships. Racoon remained with the Fifth Destroyer Flotilla into 1917. In March, the destroyer attacked a German submarine with depth charges while escorting the troopship Osmanieh. However, by October that year, the vessel had moved to the Second Destroyer Flotilla, based at Buncrana in the north of Ireland. The Admiralty deployed the destroyers based there as escorts to convoys to protect them from German submarines. The service was demanding, but succeeded in bringing many ships safely to port. Early in the morning of 9 January 1918, northbound back to Buncrana and under the command of Lt. George L. M. Napier, Racoon struck rocks within a few miles of the entrance to Lough Swilly in a snowstorm. There were no survivors.

== Pennant numbers ==
Pennant numbers
Pennant number	Date
HA7	January 1918
