= HMS Basilisk (1910) =

Destroyer of the Royal Navy

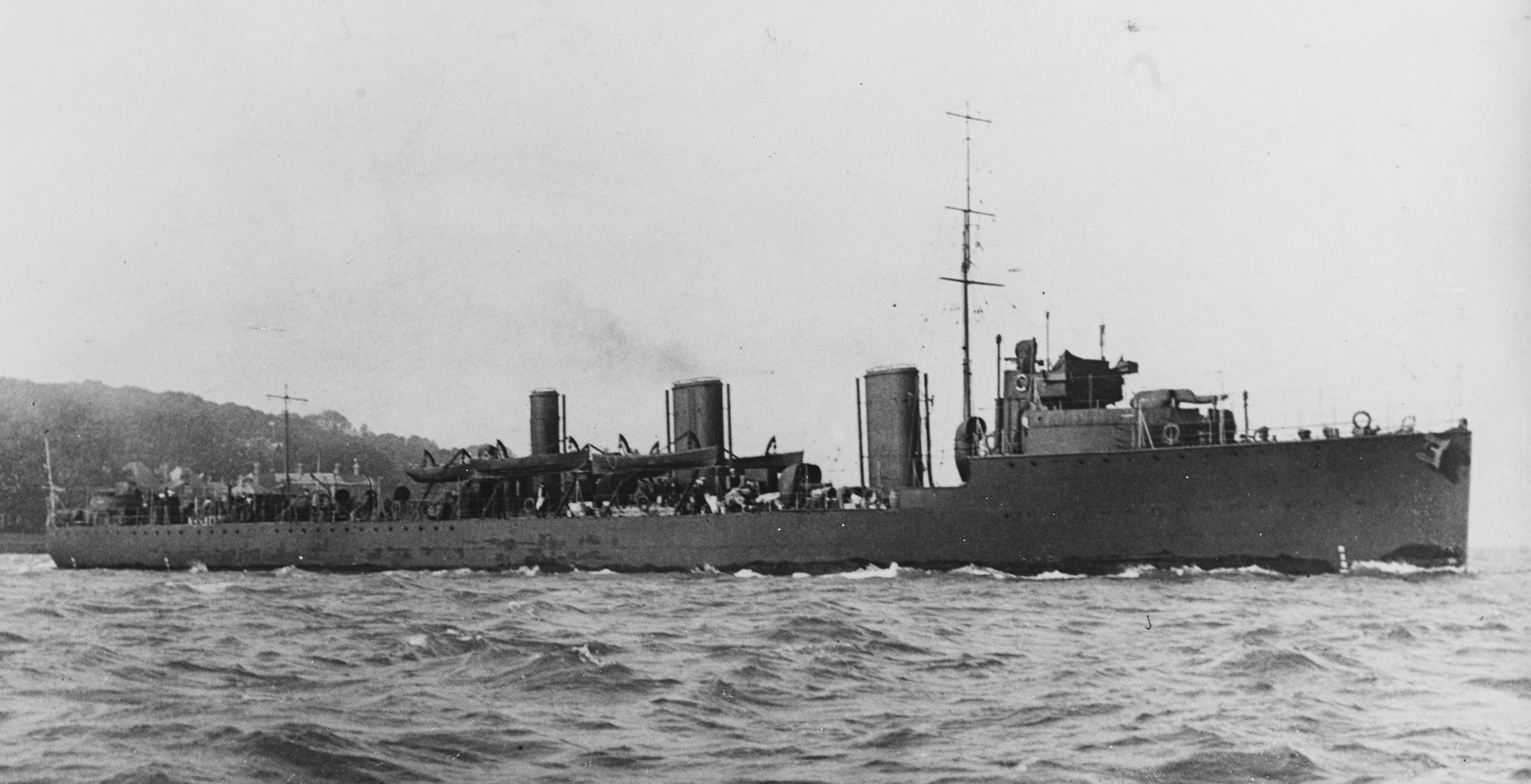
- Basilisk

History

United Kingdom
- Name: Basilisk
- Namesake: Basilisk
- Builder: J. Samuel White, Cowes
- Laid down: 11 May 1909
- Launched: 9 February 1910
- Commissioned: 17 September 1910
- Out of service: 1 November 1921
- Fate: Sold to the broken up

General characteristics
- Class & type: Beagle-class destroyer
- Displacement: 976 long tons (992 t) (normal)
- Length: 266 ft (81.1 m)
- Beam: 28 ft (8.5 m)
- Draught: 16 ft 6 in (5 m)
- Installed power: 5 x coal-fired White-Forster boilers, 12,000 shp (8,900 kW)
- Propulsion: 3 x steam turbines driving 3 shafts
- Speed: 27 kn (50 km/h; 31 mph)
- Range: 2,000 nmi (3,700 km; 2,300 mi) at 15 knots (28 km/h; 17 mph)
- Complement: 96
- Armament: 1 × 4 in (102 mm) gun; 3 × 12 pdr 3 in (76 mm) guns; 2 × single 21 in (533 mm) torpedo tubes

HMS Basilisk was a Beagle-class (from 1913 G-class) destroyer of the British Royal Navy. The Beagles were coal-fuelled ships, designed for a speed of 27 kn (31 mph; 50 km/h) and armed with a 4 in (102 mm) gun and two torpedo tubes. Built by J. Samuel White and launched in 1910, Basilisk was initially commissioned into the First Destroyer Flotilla at Portsmouth. In 1912, the warship joined the Third Destroyer Flotilla before being transferred to the Mediterranean Fleet as part of the Fifth Destroyer Flotilla in 1913. As the First World War approached, the destroyer was based in Alexandria, Egypt, but was swiftly redeployed to Malta, followed, in 1915, by action in the Dardanelles Campaign. After the Armistice of 1918 that ended the war, Basilisk was initially transferred to the Nore and then sold in 1921 to be broken up.

== Design and development ==
Basilisk was one of the Beagle-class destroyers ordered by the Admiralty as part of the 1908–1909 shipbuilding programme. The bridge was larger and higher than previous designs and the vessels were coal-burning after concerns had been raised about the availability of fuel oil in time of war. This reduced costs, although it also meant that five boilers were needed, the extra machinery meaning that deck space became more premium. The Beagle-class vessels were not built to a standard design, with detailed design being left to the builders of individual ships in accordance with a loose specification, in this case J. Samuel White. The class were also known, on occasion, as the Basilisk class, named after this vessel. In October 1913, as part of a wider renaming of the Royal Navy's warships into classes named alphabetically, the class was renamed as the G-class. (Note: The Laforey-class (L-class) under construction were renamed so, for the first time, the destroyers' names matched the class designation.)

Basilisk was 275 ft (83.8 m) long, with a beam of 28 ft (8.5 m) and a draught of 16 ft 6 in (5 m). Normal displacement was 976 long tons (992 t). Five White-Forster boilers fed direct-drive Parsons steam turbines driving three shafts. Two funnels were fitted. The machinery was rated at 12,000 shaft horsepower (8,900 kW) giving a design speed of 27 kn (31 mph; 50 km/h). During sea trials, the destroyer reached a speed of 27.984 kn (32.203 mph; 51.826 km/h) at a displacement of 968 long tons (984 t). Up to 226 long tons (230 t) of coal was carried, giving a design range of 2,000 nautical miles (3,700 km; 2,300 mi) at 15 knots (28 km/h; 17 mph). The ship had a complement of 96 officers and ratings.

Armament consisted of one 4 in (102 mm) BL Mk VIII gun forward and three 3 in (76 mm) QF 12-pounder 12 cwt guns aft. (Note: "Cwt" is the abbreviation for hundredweight, 12cwt referring to the weight of the gun.) Torpedo armament consisted of two rotating 21 in (533 mm) torpedo tubes, one placed forward and the other aft. Two spare torpedoes were carried. On 8 April 1916, the Admiralty approved fitting the destroyer with depth charges. Two depth charge launchers and two charges were carried.

== Construction and career ==
Basilisk was laid down by J. Samuel White at East Cowes on the Isle of Wight with the yard number 1293 on 11 May 1909, and launched on 9 February the following year. The ship cost £109,729. Basilisk was the ninth to serve in the Royal Navy named for the mythical creature. The vessel was commissioned at Portsmouth and joined the First Destroyer Flotilla on 17 September. In 1912, a reorganisation of the Home Fleet resulted in the ships of the Beagle class forming the Third Destroyer Flotilla. The vessel remained part of the Third Flotilla in March 1913. Basilisk was transferred, along with the rest of the class, to the newly-formed Fifth Destroyer Flotilla as part of the Mediterranean Fleet.

As the First World War approached, Basilisk was part of the Second Division of the Fifth Flotilla and based in Alexandria. The destroyer sailed to Malta, joining the rest of the flotilla on 9 August. The island had a coal shortage, which restricted the vessel's activity. On 6 August 1914, the Second Division was deployed searching for the German battlecruiser Goeben and light cruiser Breslau but this was curtailed by a lack of fuel. On 18 August, the destroyer was deployed to Suez to deter the Ottoman Empire from restricting British access to the Suez Canal. From 25 October, the destroyer, along with sister ship Racoon, patrolled the Gulf of Suez. The ship subsequently joined the force based in the Suez Canal and Red Sea to protect the sea lane for Allied shipping.

On 19 November, Basilisk sailed for Tenedos and spent the next year supporting the naval operations in the Dardanelles Campaign. In preparation for the assault, the Admiralty decided to attack the defences on the Dardanelles strait with the pre-dreadnought battleships Albion, Majestic and Triumph. The attack was largely ineffective as the troops moved the batteries so they were safe from bombardment. On 26 February 1915, Basilisk, alongside Racoon, escorted the battleships Cornwallis, Irresistible and Vengeance as they attempted to land parties to attack the batteries. This was also largely ineffective and also exposed the force to the presence of large minefields across the narrows of the Dardanelles straits.

On the night of 1/2 March, along with sister ships Grasshopper, Mosquito and Racoon, the destroyer escorted trawlers attempting to clear the minefields. The force came under heavy fire from Turkish guns, and were forced to turn back before reaching the minefields. It was then decided to clear the minefields by day while the British and French battleships suppressed the Turkish guns that protected the minefields. This was attempted on the following day, with Basilisk, Grasshopper, Mosquito and Racoon again escorting the minesweeping trawlers. The attempt failed, however, with the fire from mobile guns forcing the minesweepers to turn back. Even more consequentially, the battleships Ocean and Irresistible, along with the Bouvet, hit mines and sank. On 6 August, the ship carried troops of the IX Corps to their landing at Suvla Bay. After the army had retreated, the destroyer then escorted the light cruiser Chatham, the flagship of Admiral Rosslyn Wemyss, in bombarding Ottoman Army positions at Suvla.

The destroyer remained a member of the Fifth Destroyer Flotilla within the Mediterranean Fleet. The need for destroyer escorts increased dramatically as the Imperial German Navy introduced unrestricted submarine warfare. By June 1917, the submarines were sinking 142,338 long tons (144,622 t) of shipping a month. In response, the Admiralty introduced convoys on major routes, including those between Malta and Egypt, escorted by destroyers. On 20 January 1918, Basilisk, along with the monitors M29 and M32, was detached to Alexandria.

After the Armistice of 11 November 1918 that ended the war, the Royal Navy quickly withdrew all pre-war destroyers from active service. By February 1919, Basilisk had been transferred to The Nore. As the force returned to a peacetime level of strength, both the number of ships and personnel needed to be reduced to save money. Declared superfluous to operational requirements, Basilisk was retired, and, on 1 November 1921, sold to Fryer of Sunderland to be broken up.

== Pennant numbers ==
Pennant numbers
Pennant number	Date
D89	February 1915
H89	February 1915
HC8	September 1919
H33	January 1919
