= HMS Scorpion (1910) =

Destroyer of the Royal Navy

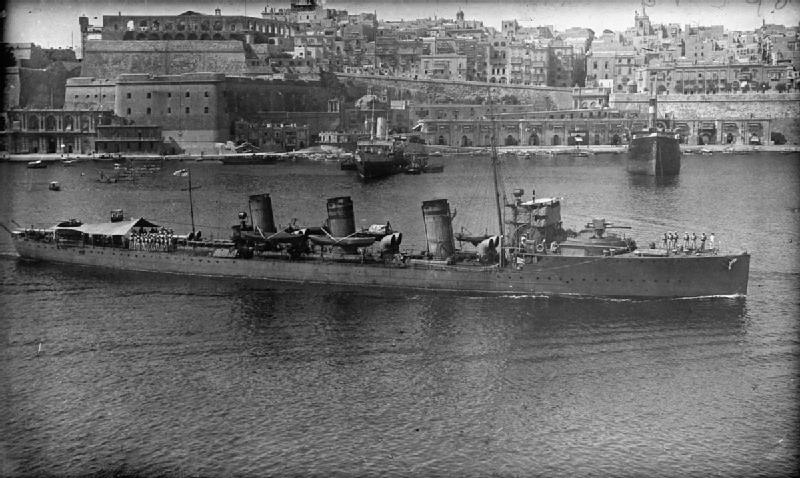
- Scorpion in Valletta harbour, Malta, 1915

History

United Kingdom
- Name: HMS Scorpion
- Builder: Fairfield Shipbuilding & Engineering Company, Govan
- Launched: 19 February 1910
- Commissioned: 30 August 1910
- Fate: Sold for breaking up, 26 October 1921

General characteristics
- Class & type: Beagle-class destroyer
- Displacement: 860–940 long tons (874–955 t)
- Length: 275 ft (84 m)
- Beam: 27 ft 6 in (8.38 m)
- Draught: 8 ft 6 in (2.59 m)
- Installed power: 12,500 hp (9,300 kW)
- Propulsion: Coal-fired boilers, 2 or 3 shaft steam turbines
- Speed: 27 knots (50 km/h; 31 mph)
- Complement: 96
- Armament: 1 × BL 4-inch (100 mm) L/40 Mark VIII guns, mounting P Mark V; 3 × QF 12 pdr 12 cwt Mark I, mounting P Mark I; 2 × single 21 inch (533 mm) torpedo tubes

HMS Scorpion was one of sixteen Beagle-class destroyers in service with the Royal Navy in the First World War. She was built by Fairfields Govan shipyards on the Clyde and was commissioned on 30 August 1910. She was a coal powered ship and as such was obsolete by the end of the First World War and was scrapped in 1921.

== Construction and design ==
Scorpion was one of three Beagle-class destroyers ordered from Fairfield Shipbuilding and Engineering Company as part of the 1908–1909 shipbuilding programme. The Beagles were not built to a standard design, with detailed design being left to the builders of individual ships in accordance with a loose specification.

The three Fairfield ships were 271 feet (82.6 m) long, with a beam of 27.7 feet (8.4 m) and a draught of 8.7 feet 8 inches (2.9 m). Displacement was 916 long tons (931 t) normal. Five Yarrow boilers fed direct-drive Parsons steam turbines driving three propeller shafts. The machinery was rated at 12,000 shp (8,900 kW) giving a design speed of 27 kn (31 mph; 50 km/h). Gun armament consisted of one BL 4 inch naval gun Mk VIII and three QF 12-pounder 12 cwt guns. (Note: "Cwt" is the abbreviation for hundredweight, 12cwt referring to the weight of the gun.) Torpedo armament consisted of two 21 inch (533 mm) torpedo tubes. Two spare torpedoes were carried. The ship had a crew of 96 officers and men.

Scorpion was laid down at Fairfield Shipbuilding and Engineering Company's Govan, Glasgow shipyard on 3 May 1909 and was launched on 19 February 1910. She reached a speed of 27.1 kn (31.2 mph; 50.2 km/h) during sea trials, and was completed in August 1910.

== Service ==
On commissioning, Scorpion joined the First Destroyer Flotilla of the Home Fleet.

The first commander of HMS Scorpion was the then Lieutenant-Commander Andrew Cunningham, who remained in command of the destroyer from January 1911 to January 1918. Early days in Scorpion included the Naval Review of 1911 that stood out in Cunningham's mind as the zenith of British naval power with twenty-six miles of ships including 42 battleships and 68 destroyers.

On 15 November 1911, Scorpion was in collision with the Danish schooner Fyn when the First Flotilla was returning to Harwich after exercises in the English Channel. Scorpion was holed close to her engine room and was towed to port by sister ship Renard, while flooding forced Fyn to be abandoned near the Goodwin Sands. Scorpion was repaired at Chatham Dockyard. In 1912, the destroyers of the Beagle-class transferred to the newly established Third Destroyer Flotilla.

In 1913 the period in home waters came to an end with the Beagle-class, including Scorpion, posted to the Mediterranean, forming the Fifth Destroyer Flotilla.

=== First World War ===
Scorpion remained as part of the Fifth Flotilla of the Mediterranean Fleet at the outbreak of the First World War in August 1914. The early part of the war saw her involved in the chase of the German battlecruiser Goeben and cruiser Breslau. Scorpion was one of eight destroyers deployed by Rear Admiral Ernest Troubridge to assist his squadron of Armoured cruisers in stopping the German ships escaping to Austrian waters. When it was realised that Goeben and Breslau were not heading to Austria, Troubridge left these destroyers behind as they did not have sufficient coal left for a high speed pursuit, and set off southwards on the night of 6/7 August 1914 with his four Armoured cruisers. He called off his pursuit later that night because he could not intercept the German squadron until daylight, when Goeben's superior speed and armament would give the Germans a significant advantage. On 1 November 1914 she and the destroyer Wolverine sank the Turkish armed yacht Beyrout in Vourla harbour, in a search for vessels believed to be involved in minelaying operations in the Gulf of Smyrna.

In 1915, she took part in the naval operations in the Dardanelles campaign. Initial operations involved escorting minesweepers attempting to clear the minefields in the mouth of the Dardanelles, with Scorpion (Note: along with Wolverine, Renard and Grampus) escorting minesweeping trawlers on the night of 3/4 March 1915. On 4 March, two companies of Royal Marines were landed at Kum Kale and Sedd el Bahr in attempt to ensure that forts and gun batteries damaged in previous naval bombardments were completely demolished. (Note: Previous, smaller raids on 26 and 27 February and 1 March had proved relatively successful.) The landings came under heavy fire, and despite gunfire support from ships, including Scorpion, which knocked out a gun battery, the Marines were forced to withdraw without achieving their objectives and were picked up by the supporting ships, with Scorpion's cutter picking up 7 men cut off on a beach. In total 23 Marines were killed or missing and 25 wounded.
