= HMS Bulldog (1909) =

History

United Kingdom
- Name: HMS Bulldog
- Builder: John Brown & Company, Clydebank
- Laid down: 30 March 1909
- Launched: 13 November 1909
- Commissioned: 7 July 1910
- Out of service: 1919
- Honours and awards: Dardanelles 1915 - 1916
- Fate: Sold for breaking, 21 September 1920

General characteristics
- Class & type: Beagle-class destroyer...
- Displacement: 860 long tons (874 t)
- Length: 287 ft (87 m)
- Beam: 28 ft (8.5 m)
- Draught: 8 ft 9 in (2.67 m)
- Installed power: 12,500 hp (9,300 kW) under a forced draught
- Propulsion: 5 x Yarrow Coal-fired boilers, 3 x Parson's steam turbines driving 3 shafts
- Speed: 27 knots (50 km/h; 31 mph)
- Range: 205 long tons (208 t) tons coal 1,530 NM @ 15 Knots
- Complement: 96
- Armament: 1 × 4-in (102 mm) /40 BL Mark VIII naval gun, on a CP Mk III* mounting; 3 × QF 12 pdr 12 cwt Mark I, mounting P Mark I; 2 × single 21 inch (533 mm) torpedo tubes

HMS Bulldog was one of sixteen destroyers ordered under the 1908- 09 Naval Estimates from John Brown & Company of Clydebank. Named for the English bulldog, she was the fifth ship to carry this name since it was introduced in 1782 for a 16-gun Sloop broken in 1829. The destroyers of the 1908-09 program would be the last coal-fired destroyers of the Royal Navy. She and her sisters served in the First Destroyer Flotilla then were moved en masse to the Third Destroyer Flotilla and before the start of the Great War to the Fifth Destroyer Flotilla. With the advent of the convoy system they were moved to the Second Destroyer Flotilla. With the Armistice she was laid up then scrapped in 1920.

== Construction and design ==
Laid down as Yard No 388 on 30 March 1909 at the John Brown & Company's shipyard at Clydebank she was launched on 13 November 1909. During her 8-hour trials she averaged 27 knots.

== Service ==
She was commissioned on 7 July 1910 for service with the First Destroyer Flotilla of the First Division of the Home Fleet tendered to HMS Blake. In March 1911 she cruised to Norway arriving at Trondheim on 6 March. By 1 May 1912 she was assigned to the Third Destroyer Flotilla tendered to HMS Blenheim

On 30 August 1912 the Admiralty directed all destroyer classes were to be designated by alpha characters starting with the letter ‘A’. After 30 September 1913, she was known as a G-class destroyer and had the letter ‘G’ painted on her hull below the bridge area and on her fore funnel

In October 1913 as the L-class destroyers came on line the entire G-class was moved to the newly formed Fifth Destroyer Flotilla along with HMS Blenheim and sent to the Mediterranean and based at Malta

On 9 August, HMS Beagle and HMS Bulldog joined the 1st Division at Port Vathi on the Island of Ithaca off the west coast of Greece. The units of the 1st Division were short of coal and were awaiting the arrival of a collier. After coaling, the ten destroyers were ordered to establish a patrol line in the Aegean Sea off the Dardanelles thereby blockading the German ships there.

In November 1914 HMS Bulldog was one of the first eight G-class destroyers recalled from the Mediterranean Fleet and assigned to the Portsmouth Local Flotilla. The destroyers, now known by their nickname the ‘Mediterranean Beagles’, were recalled with the idea of forming the Tenth Destroyer Flotilla for operations up to and including a landing on the Flanders Coast. However, with the Russians urging the British to bring pressure on the Turks and relieve the offensive in the Caucasus these eight ‘Beagles’ were returned to the Mediterranean Fleet for the Dardanelles campaign in March. By March 1915 she deployed with the Fifth Destroyer Flotilla to the Dardanelles.

On 16 April 1916 while on G Patrol off the mouth of the Dardanelles, she struck a contact mine off Gallipoli. She was badly damaged aft and suffered the loss of one officer and six men. She was towed to Mudros, then to Malta for repairs. She returned to the G Patrol on 4 December.

In mid-1917 as the convoy system was being introduced, the Admiralty began reassigning older destroyers to escort duties. She was recalled to Home Waters and assigned to the 2nd Destroyer Flotilla now based at Buncrana, Ireland on Lough Swilly in October 1917. Equipped with depth charges she was employed for anti-submarine patrols and as a convoy escort for the North West Approaches to the British Isles for the remainder of the war.

== Disposition ==
In February 1919 with the disbandment of the Second Destroyer Flotilla she was withdrawn from active service and laid up in reserve at the Nore. In April 1920 she was placed on the disposal list. She was sold on 21 September 1920 to Thos. W. Ward of Sheffield for breaking at Rainham, Kent, on Thames Estuary.
