= HMS Nautilus (1910) =

Destroyer of the Royal Navy

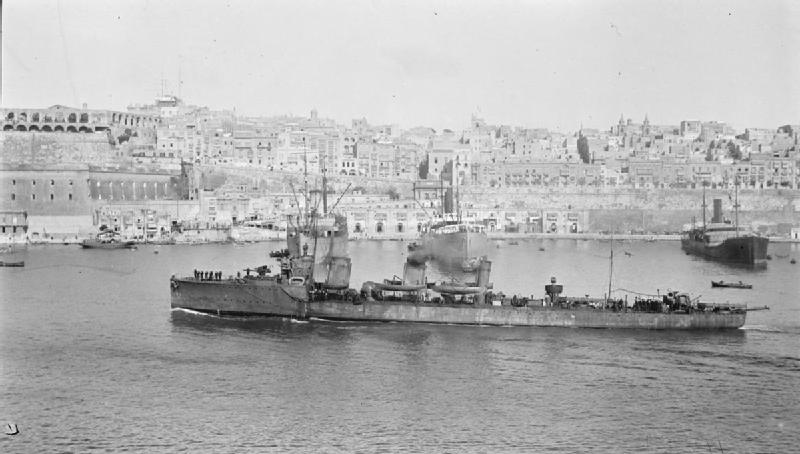
- Grampus entering Valletta harbour, Malta in 1916

History

United Kingdom
- Name: HMS Nautilus
- Builder: Thames Ironworks and Shipbuilding Company, Leamouth
- Commissioned: 30 March 1910, as Nautilus
- Renamed: Grampus, 16 December 1913
- Fate: Sold for breaking up, September 1920

General characteristics
- Type: Beagle-class destroyer
- Displacement: 860–940 long tons (874–955 t)
- Length: 275 ft (84 m)
- Beam: 27 ft 6 in (8.38 m)
- Draught: 8 ft 6 in (2.59 m)
- Installed power: 12,500 hp (9,300 kW)
- Propulsion: Coal-fired boilers, 2 or 3 shaft steam turbines
- Speed: 27 knots (50 km/h; 31 mph)
- Complement: 96
- Armament: 1 × BL 4-inch (100 mm) L/40 Mark VIII guns, mounting P Mark V; 3 × QF 12 pdr 12 cwt Mark I, mounting P Mark I; 2 × single 21 inch (533 mm) torpedo tubes

HMS Nautilus was a Beagle-class destroyer of the Royal Navy. She was commissioned on 30 March 1910 from Thames Ironworks & Shipbuilding Company. She was renamed HMS Grampus on 16 December 1913, her former name being reallocated to HMS Nautilus, the first Royal Navy submarine to be given one.

== Service history ==
Nautilus joined the First Destroyer Flotilla when she commissioned on 12 September 1911, replacing the River-class destroyer Rother.

During the First World War, Grampus participated in the Dardanelles Campaign against the Ottoman Empire.

On 17 April 1915, in an attempt to break through the Dardanelles, the submarine HMS E15 ran aground under Kephaz Point. She was fired on and disabled, her captain, Lieutenant Commander T. S. Brodie and several of her crew were killed; the remainder taken prisoner. To prevent her capture, the Royal Navy tried over the next two days to destroy the submarine. Grampus was involved in one of the many failed attempts; she was simply unable to locate E15.

On 6 August, HMS Grampus landed 11th Battalion, The Manchester Regiment of the 11th (Northern) Division inside Suvla Bay, but on the wrong part of the beach. The troops were ill-supplied and ran critically short of drinking water in the actions that followed; on 8 August, HMS Grampus cut one of her own water tanks loose and floated it ashore, which allowed the men who recovered it about a pint (0.5 litre) each.

Grampus was sold Thos. W. Ward for scrapping at Rainham, Kent on 21 September 1920.

== Publications ==
- Colledge, J. J.; Warlow, Ben (2006) [1969]. Ships of the Royal Navy: The Complete Record of All Fighting Ships of the Royal Navy from the 15th Century to the Present (3rd Rev ed.). London: Chatham Publishing. ISBN 978-1-86176-281-8. OCLC 67375475.
