= HMS Cornwallis (1901) =

Pre-dreadnought battleship of the British Royal Navy

Coordinates: 35°06′N 15°11′E

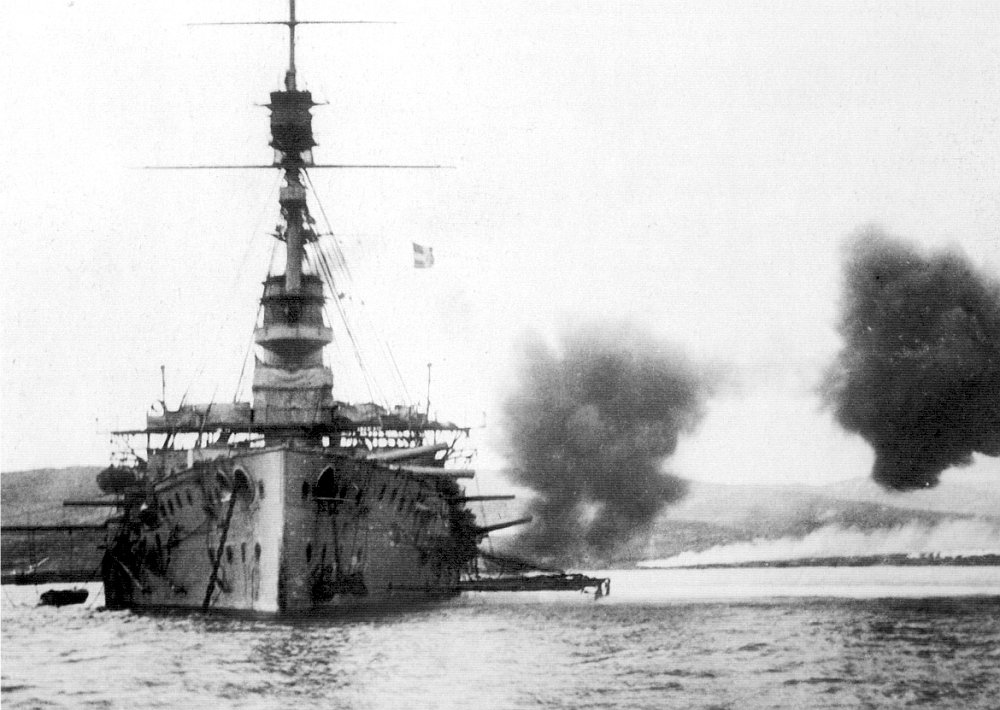
- Cornwallis fires a broadside during the withdrawal from Suvla Bay in December 1915

History

United Kingdom
- Name: HMS Cornwallis
- Namesake: William Cornwallis
- Builder: Thames Ironworks and Shipbuilding Company
- Laid down: 19 July 1899
- Launched: 17 July 1901
- Completed: February 1904
- Commissioned: 9 February 1904
- Fate: Sunk, 9 January 1917

General characteristics
- Class & type: Duncan-class battleship
- Displacement: Normal: 13,270 to 13,745 long tons (13,483 to 13,966 t); Full load: 14,900 to 15,200 long tons (15,100 to 15,400 t)
- Length: 432 ft (132 m) (loa)
- Beam: 75 ft 6 in (23.01 m)
- Draught: 25 ft 9 in (7.85 m)
- Installed power: 18,000 ihp (13,000 kW); 24 × Belleville water-tube boilers
- Propulsion: 2 × triple-expansion steam engines; 2 × screw propellers
- Speed: 19 knots (35 km/h; 22 mph)
- Range: 6,070 nmi (11,240 km; 6,990 mi) at 10 knots (19 km/h; 12 mph)
- Complement: 720
- Armament: 4 × 12-inch (305 mm) 40-caliber Mk IX guns; 12 × 6-inch (152 mm) 45-calibre guns; 10 × 12-pounder guns; 6 × 3-pounder guns; 4 × 18-inch (457 mm) torpedo tubes (submerged)
- Armour: Belt: 7 in (178 mm); Bulkheads: 11–7 in (279–178 mm); Decks: 2–1 in (51–25 mm); Turrets: 10–8 in (254–203 mm); Barbettes: 11–4 in (279–102 mm); Casemates: 6 in (152 mm); Conning tower: 12 in (305 mm)

HMS Cornwallis was a Duncan-class battleship of the Royal Navy. Built to counter a group of fast Russian battleships, Cornwallis and her sister ships were capable of steaming at 19 knots (35 km/h; 22 mph), making them the fastest battleships in the world. The Duncan-class battleships were armed with a main battery of four 12-inch (305 mm) guns and they were broadly similar to the London-class battleships, though of a slightly reduced displacement and thinner armour layout. As such, they reflected a development of the lighter second-class ships of the Canopus-class battleship. Cornwallis was built between her keel laying in July 1899 and her completion in February 1904.

After commissioning in 1904, Cornwallis was assigned to the Mediterranean Fleet until 1905, when she was transferred to the Channel Fleet. She stayed there for two years before being moved to the Atlantic Fleet, where she remained until 1909, at which point she returned to the Mediterranean Fleet. In 1912, she was reassigned to the Home Fleet, first to the 4th Battle Squadron and then to the 6th Battle Squadron, where she was stationed at the outbreak of the First World War. The 6th Squadron covered the crossing of the British Expeditionary Force to France in August 1914, and thereafter its ships were transferred to the 3rd Battle Squadron to reinforce the Grand Fleet on the Northern Patrol.

In January 1915, Cornwallis was sent to the Mediterranean to take part in the Dardanelles campaign against the Ottoman Empire. She fired the first shots of the campaign on 19 February during a bombardment of Ottoman coastal defences. Over the following two months, she participated in numerous attacks on the forts that failed to destroy them, leading to the decision that a major ground attack would be necessary to neutralise the defences. Cornwallis supported the Landing at Cape Helles on 25 April and shelled Ottoman troops over the following month as the Allied soldiers sought to push further inland. She thereafter served with the Suez Canal Patrol and briefly on the East Indies Station until March 1916, when she returned to the Mediterranean. While on patrol off Malta on 9 January 1917, she was torpedoed and sunk by the German U-boat U-32.

== Design ==
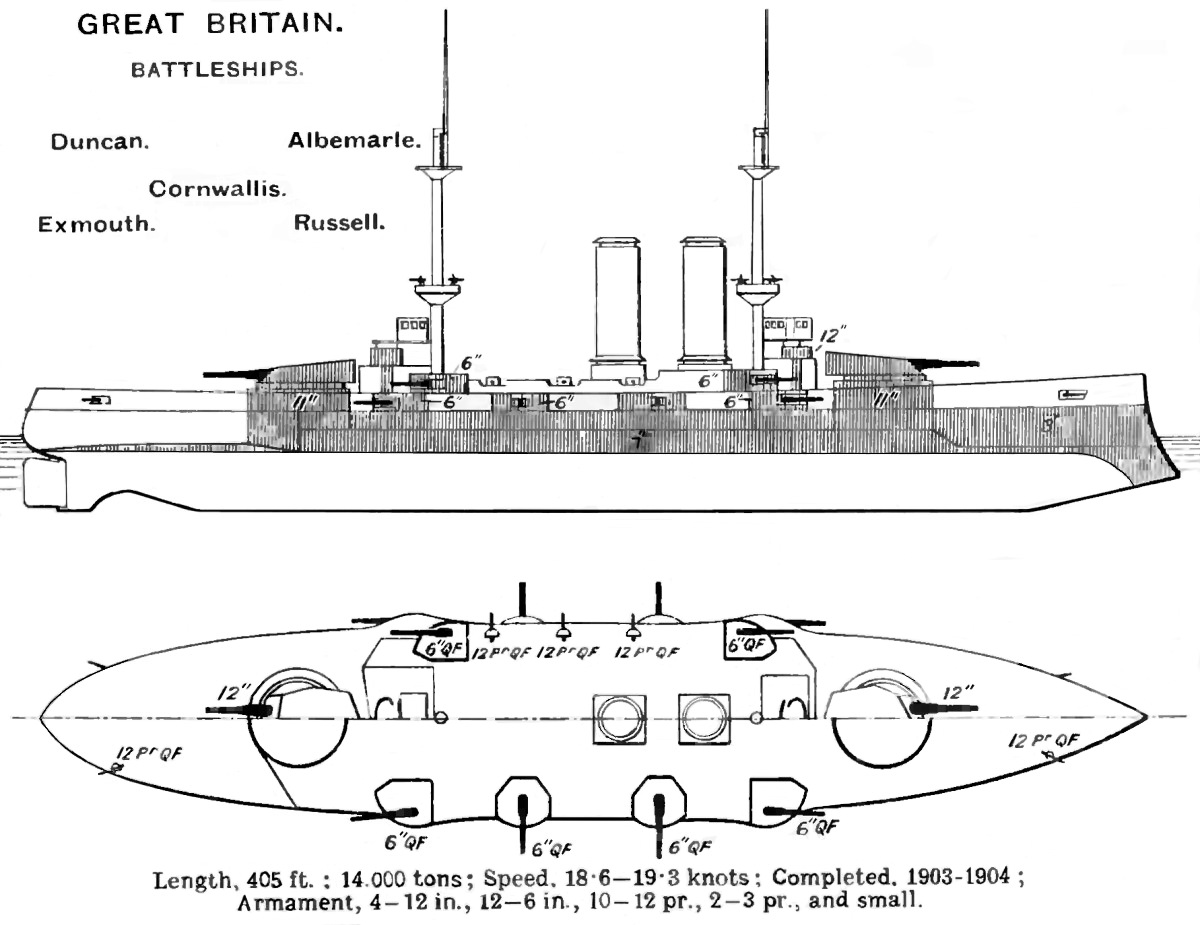
Right elevation and deck plan as depicted in Brassey's Naval Annual 1915

The six ships of the Duncan class were ordered in response to the Russian Peresvet-class battleships that had been launched in 1898. The Russian ships were fast second-class battleships, so William Henry White, the British Director of Naval Construction, designed the Duncan class to match the purported top speed of the Russian vessels. To achieve the higher speed while keeping displacement from growing, White was forced to reduce the ships' armour protection significantly, effectively making the ships enlarged and improved versions of the Canopus-class battleships of 1896, rather than derivatives of the more powerful Majestic, Formidable, and London series of first-class battleships. The Duncans proved to be disappointments in service, owing to their reduced defensive characteristics, though they were still markedly superior to the Peresvets they had been built to counter.

Cornwallis was 432 feet (132 m) long overall, with a beam of 75 ft 6 in (23.01 m) and a draft of 25 ft 9 in (7.85 m). The Duncan-class battleships displaced 13,270 to 13,745 long tons (13,483 to 13,966 t) normally and up to 14,900 to 15,200 long tons (15,100 to 15,400 t) fully loaded. Her crew numbered 720 officers and ratings. The Duncan-class ships were powered by a pair of 4-cylinder triple-expansion engines that drove two screws, with steam provided by twenty-four Belleville boilers. The boilers were trunked into two funnels located amidships. The Duncan-class ships had a top speed of 19 knots (35 km/h; 22 mph) from 18,000 indicated horsepower (13,000 kW). This made Cornwallis and her sisters the fastest battleships in the world for several years. At a cruising speed of 10 knots (19 km/h; 12 mph), the ship could steam for 6,070 nautical miles (11,240 km; 6,990 mi).

Cornwallis had a main battery of four 12-inch (305 mm) 40-calibre guns mounted in twin-gun turrets fore and aft. The ships also mounted a secondary battery of twelve 6-inch (152 mm) 45-calibre guns mounted in casemates, in addition to ten 12-pounder 3 in (76 mm) guns and six 3-pounder 47 mm (1.9 in) guns for defence against torpedo boats. As was customary for battleships of the period, she was also equipped with four 18-inch (457 mm) torpedo tubes submerged in the hull.

Cornwallis had an armoured belt that was 7 in (178 mm) thick; the transverse bulkhead on the aft end of the belt was 7 to 11 in (178 to 279 mm) thick. Her main battery turrets' sides were 8 to 10 in (203 to 254 mm) thick, atop 11 in (279 mm) barbettes, and the casemate battery was protected with 6 in of Krupp steel. Her conning tower had 12-inch-thick sides. She was fitted with two armoured decks, 1 and 2 in (25 and 51 mm) thick, respectively.

== Operational history ==
=== Pre-First World War ===
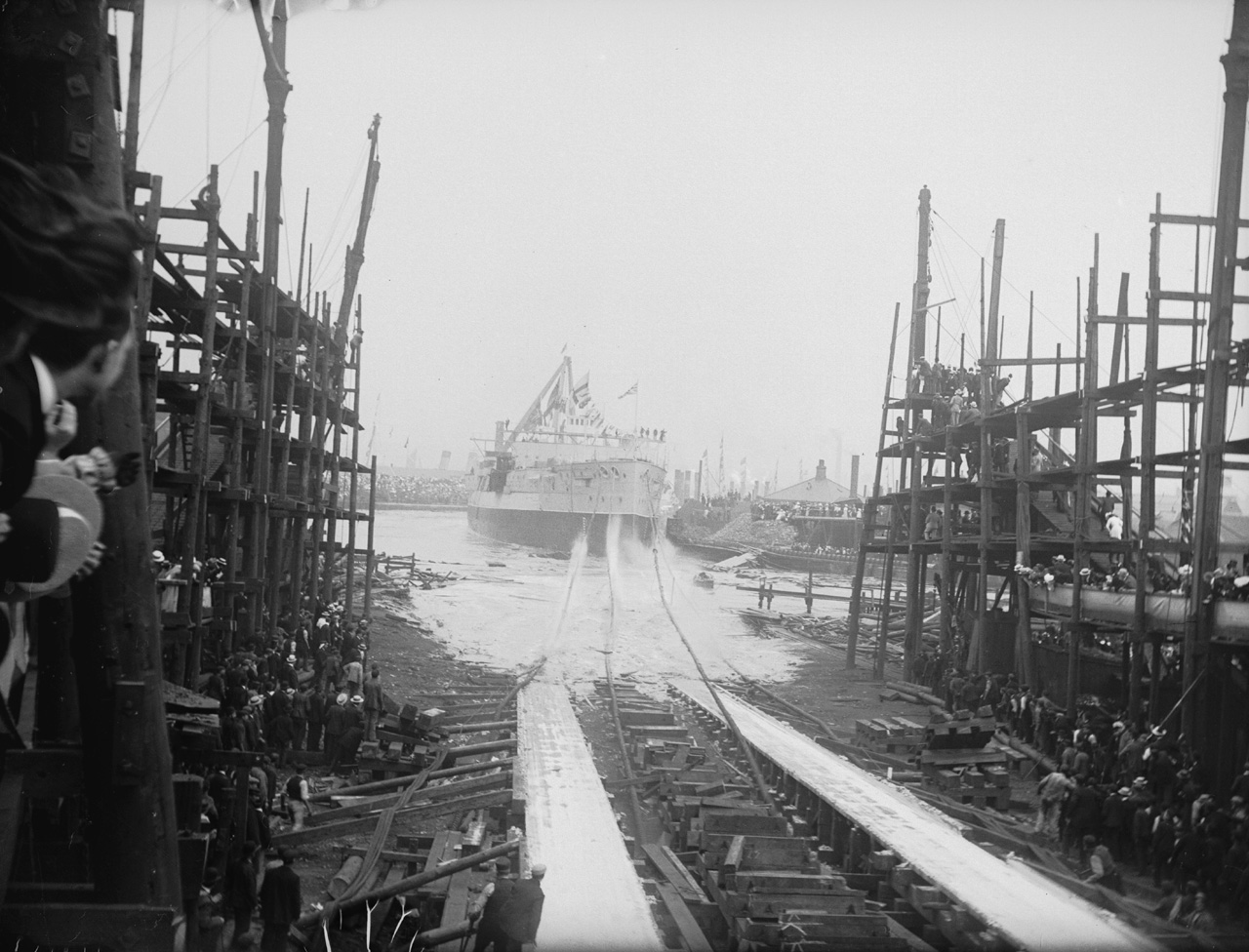
Launch of Cornwallis, 17 July 1901

HMS Cornwallis, named for William Cornwallis, was laid down by Thames Ironworks and Shipbuilding Company at Leamouth, London on 19 July 1899 and launched on 17 July 1901, when she was christened by Mrs. William L. Ainslie, wife of one of the directors. The launching ceremony was subdued, due to the Court mourning following the death of Queen Victoria, yet the launch was witnessed by a vast throng of spectators, including diplomats from the other naval powers at the time. She went to Chatham Dockyard to be armed and completed for sea in September 1902. The work was completed in February 1904.

Cornwallis was commissioned on 9 February 1904 to relieve the battleship Renown in the Mediterranean Fleet. In the Mediterranean Sea she collided with the Greek brigantine Angelica on 17 September 1904, but suffered no serious damage. She transferred to the Channel Fleet in February 1905, then to the Atlantic Fleet on 14 January 1907. During her Atlantic Fleet service, she underwent a refit at Gibraltar from January to May 1908, and became Second Flagship, Rear Admiral, on 25 August 1909.

In August 1909, Cornwallis was transferred back to the Mediterranean Fleet and was based at Malta. Under a fleet reorganization on 1 May 1912, the Mediterranean Fleet battle squadron became the 4th Battle Squadron, Home Fleet, based at Gibraltar rather than Malta, and Cornwallis thus became a Home Fleet unit at Gibraltar. She was reduced to a nucleus crew in the 6th Battle Squadron, Second Fleet, in March 1914.

=== First World War ===
When the First World War began in August 1914, plans originally called for Cornwallis and battleships Agamemnon, Albemarle, Duncan, Exmouth, Russell, and Vengeance to combine in the 6th Battle Squadron and serve in the Channel Fleet, where the squadron was to patrol the English Channel and cover the movement of the British Expeditionary Force to France. However, plans also existed for the 6th Battle Squadron to be assigned to the Grand Fleet, and, when the war began, the Commander-in-Chief, Grand Fleet, Admiral Sir John Jellicoe, requested that Cornwallis and her four surviving sister ships (Albemarle, Duncan, Exmouth, and Russell) be assigned to the 3rd Battle Squadron in the Grand Fleet for patrol duties to make up for the Grand Fleet's shortage of cruisers. Accordingly, the 6th Battle Squadron was temporarily abolished, and Cornwallis joined the 3rd Battle Squadron at Scapa Flow on 8 August. The ships worked with Grand Fleet cruisers on the Northern Patrol to enforce the distant blockade of Germany.

Cornwallis and her sisters, as well as the battleships of the King Edward VII class, were temporarily transferred to the Channel Fleet on 2 November to reinforce the latter in the face of Imperial German Navy activity in its area. On 13 November, the King Edward VII-class ships returned to the Grand Fleet, but Cornwallis and the other Duncans stayed in the Channel Fleet, where they reconstituted the 6th Battle Squadron on 14 November. This squadron was given a mission of bombarding German submarine bases on the coast of Belgium, and was based at Portland, although it transferred to Dover immediately on 14 November. However, due a lack of antisubmarine defenses at Dover, the squadron returned to Portland on 19 November. The 6th Battle Squadron returned to Dover in December. Cornwallis was detached from the squadron in late December and assigned to West Ireland, where she was based at Clew Bay and Killarney Bay. She remained there until January 1915.

==== Dardanelles campaign ====
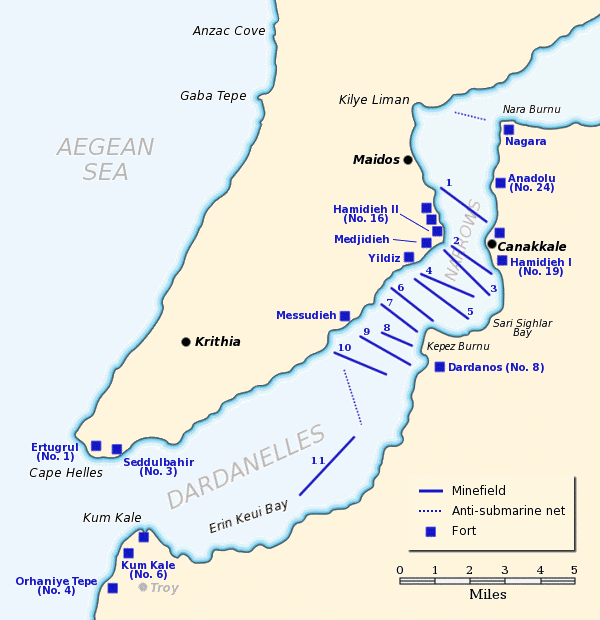
Map showing the Ottoman defences at the Dardanelles in 1915

In January 1915, Cornwallis was ordered to the Dardanelles to participate in the Dardanelles campaign against the Ottoman Empire. She departed Portland on 24 January 1915 and arrived at Tenedos to join the British Dardanelles Squadron under Admiral Sackville Carden on 13 February 1915. Cornwallis was one of six British and French battleships selected to lead the first attack on the straits on 19 February, under the operational control of Vice Admiral John de Robeck. The operational plan called for Cornwallis to suppress the Ottoman "Orkanie" coastal battery. At 09:51 on 19 February, Cornwallis fired the first shots of the Dardanelles campaign when she began her bombardment of the "Orkanie" battery, but her time on station was cut short when a defective capstan prevented her from dropping anchor. The Ottomans had not returned fire, so de Roebeck ordered his ships to anchor in place to improve their accuracy. Cornwallis was therefore replaced by the battleship Vengeance; she instead was tasked with acting as a spotter for the battleship Triumph and the battlecruiser Inflexible. Later in the day, around 15:00, Cornwallis and Vengeance joined the French battleship Suffren as it attacked the fortress at Kumkale at close range; at the same time, she used her 6-inch guns to attack the "Helles" battery. About an hour and a half later, the Ottoman coastal guns finally began to engage the Anglo-French fleet, and Cornwallis came under fire but was unscathed. By 17:20, with the setting sun beginning to silhouette his ships, Carden ordered the fleet to break off the attack and withdraw.

A second attack began on 25 February; de Roebeck, aboard Vengeance, was to lead the assault in company with Cornwallis, followed by the French Admiral Émile Paul Amable Guépratte with Suffren and Charlemagne. These four battleships attacked the defences at close range, while several other battleships shelled them at longer range to suppress the Ottoman gun crews. The other ships began shelling the Ottoman fortresses in the late morning, and de Roebeck was given the order to begin his run into the narrows at 12:15. Cornwallis followed Vengeance at a distance of four cable lengths and the two ships made their initial pass into the straits before turning about to allow Guépratte room to manoeuvre. Neither ship was damaged in the attack and de Roebeck reported that several of the Ottoman batteries were no longer manned, so Guépratte began his run. His ships received only a single shot in return, so Carden ordered a group of minesweepers to enter the straits and begin clearing the naval mines. Cornwallis and most of the rest of the fleet were detached to return to Tenedos while a few ships remained behind to cover the minesweepers.

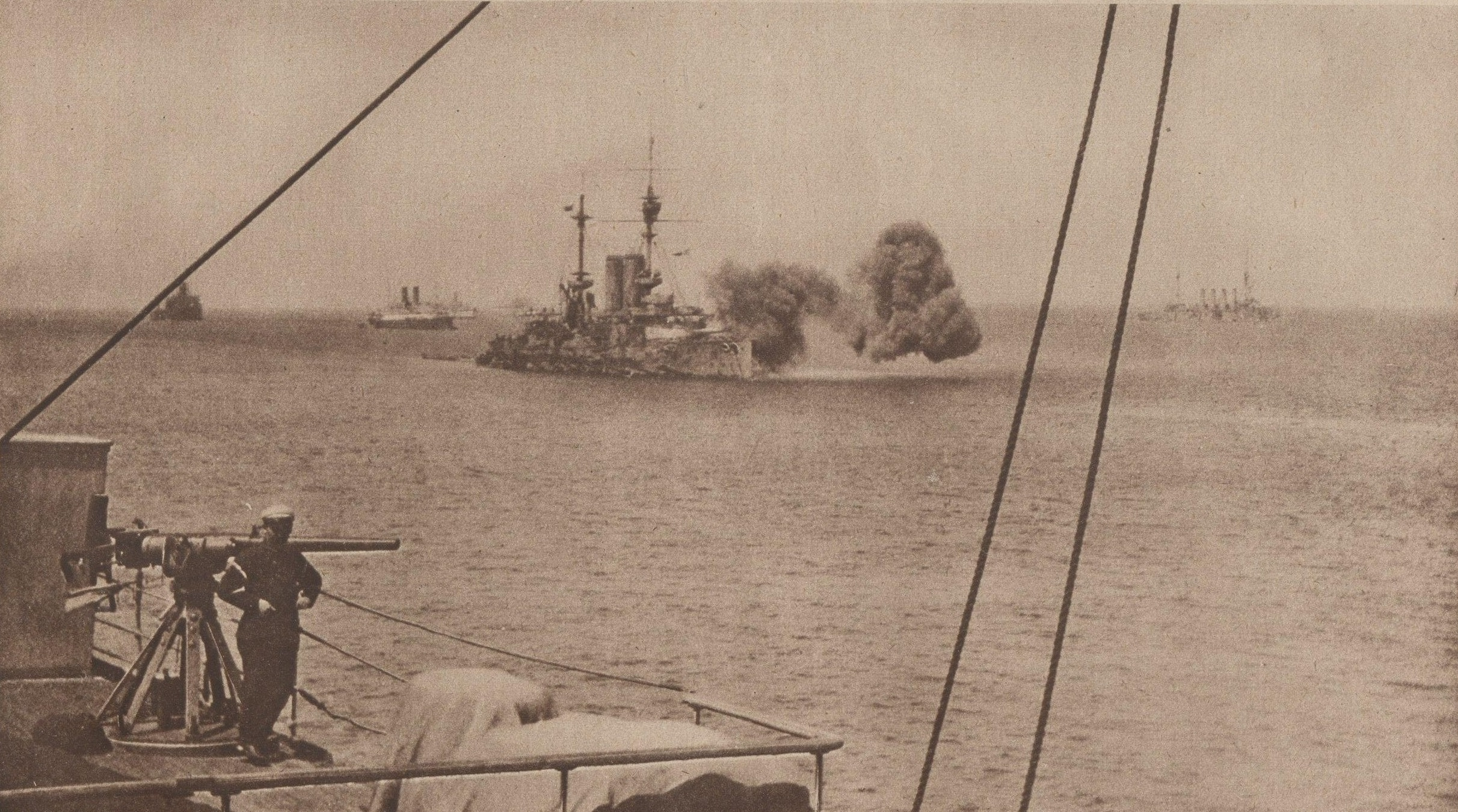
Cornwallis firing during operations off the Dardanelles

After making preparations for another major assault on the Ottoman defences, the Anglo-French fleet launched another attack on 26 February. Several ships were tasked with sending raiding parties ashore to destroy the Ottoman guns directly, while Cornwallis and several other ships bombarded the fortresses from the Aegean Sea. The landing parties succeeded in destroying several guns at Kumkale, "Orkanie", and Sedd el Bahr, but the work was not completed by the end of the operation that day. De Roebeck intended to resume the attack the following day, but poor weather prevented him from doing so. For the next major attack on 2 March, Cornwallis was assigned to the 1st Division, and the fleet was tasked with attacking fortresses further up the straits, particularly the batteries at Dardanus and Erenköy. Cornwallis was given the mission to suppress the battery of six howitzers at Intepe before joining the attack on Erenköy. She quickly neutralised the guns at Intepe before turning to shell those at Erenköy, which were also quickly suppressed. Cornwallis then fired two shells at Dardanus before de Roebeck recalled his ships, as the Ottoman guns all appeared to have been destroyed.

The British attempted another raid on 4 March; Cornwallis was stationed inside the strait to directly support a landing party of Royal Marines from the troopship SS Braemar Castle. She shelled the fort at Kumkale while the marines went ashore; they landed unopposed, but quickly encountered stiff Ottoman resistance in the village near the fort. Cornwallis and the battleship Irresistible attempted to break up the Ottoman defences, but the Ottoman fire proved to be too heavy, and the marines had to retreat. Cornwallis, Agamemnon, and the light cruiser Dublin covered their evacuation to Braemar Castle. Another attack followed the next day; Carden envisioned using the powerful super-dreadnought Queen Elizabeth, with her eight 15-inch (380 mm) guns, to bombard the inner fortresses from the Aegean coast of the Gallipoli peninsula, while Cornwallis, Irresistible, and Canopus steamed in the strait to spot for Queen Elizabeth. Poor visibility and harassing fire from mobile Ottoman field guns prevented Queen Elizabeth from inflicting serious damage, and the attack was called off.

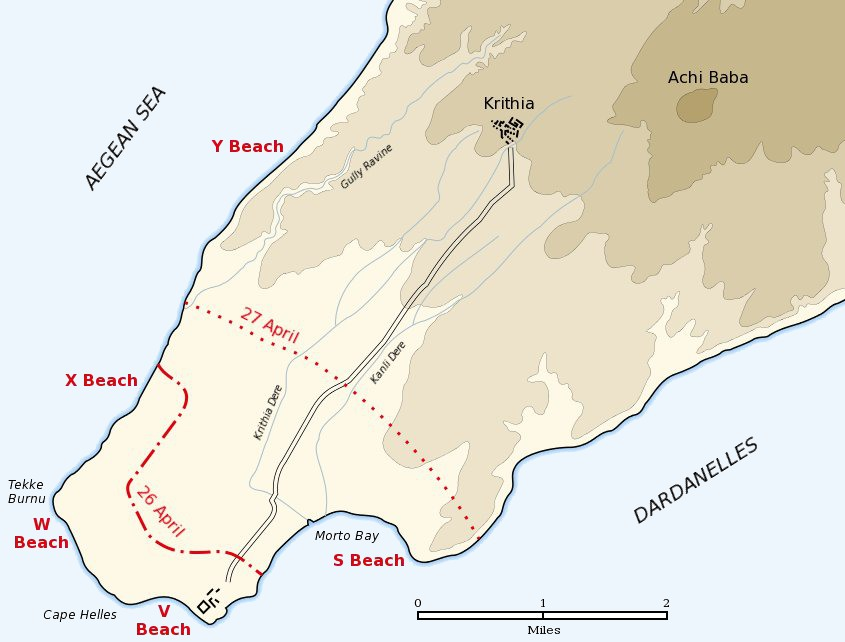
Map of the landing beaches on 25 April

Early on 10 March, Cornwallis, Irresistible, and the seaplane carrier Ark Royal went to join Dublin in the Gulf of Saros, where they were to reconnoitre the Ottoman defences further up the Gallipoli peninsula. The weather proved to be too bad for Ark Royal's seaplanes to operate, so Cornwallis shelled the town of Bulair before leaving for Tenedos. Assigned to the 2nd Division during the major attack on the forts on 18 March, she did not take an active rule in the attack that saw the sinking of three Allied battleships. The repeated failures to destroy the coastal fortifications and force the straits led the British and French commanders to decide that a major landing of ground forces would be necessary to secure the peninsula and allow a direct attack on Constantinople.

For the Landing at Cape Helles on 25 April, Cornwallis was assigned to the 1st Squadron, and she was tasked with covering the southernmost landing sites, W Beach and V Beach, along with the battleship Implacable and the armoured cruiser Euryalus, which was the flagship of Rear Admiral Rosslyn Wemyss, the 1st Squadron commander. Early on the morning of 25 April, the three ships moved into position, having taken on the men of the first three battalions to go ashore. After arriving in her bombardment location, Cornwallis transferred the soldiers to trawlers, which in turn transferred them to small boats to carry them ashore to V Beach. Wemyss instructed Cornwallis to shell the Ottoman defences until the men had landed, and then to support the landing ship River Clyde. Cornwallis conducted a heavy bombardment of the heights above V Beach as the British troops battled their way off the beach. By 10:00, the British troops had secured a beachhead, so Cornwallis left to support River Clyde that had been beached under heavy fire at Sedd el Bahr, but by this time, the decision had been made to refrain from landing the men stranded aboard River Clyde until nightfall, owing to the stiff Ottoman resistance.

As the Allied ground forces advanced on Krithia on 28 April, Cornwallis and several other battleships were assembled to provide fire support for the attack. The Ottomans blocked the attack in the First Battle of Krithia, despite the heavy fire they endured from the Anglo-French fleet. Over the following month, the British and French battleships rotated through the stations off the beachheads to support the troops ashore. Cornwallis was assigned to protect the right flank at Kereves Dere on 12–13 May in company with the battleship Goliath; in the early hours of 13 May, the Ottoman destroyer Muavenet-i Milliye slipped out of the narrows and sank Goliath. Cornwallis helped to pick up survivors. Cornwallis was again on station, this time at Suvla Bay, in early December. Here, she supported the evacuation effort, though the Ottomans made no attempt to pursue the withdrawing troops on 18 December. Cornwallis fired extensively on 20 December to destroy equipment that could not be evacuated, expending some five hundred 12-inch shells and six thousand 6-inch shells. She was the last capital ship to leave the Suvla Bay area.

==== Later operations ====
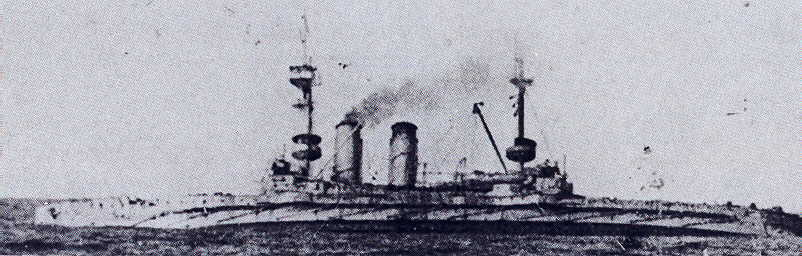
Cornwallis sinking after being torpedoed by U-32

After the Suvla Bay evacuation was complete, Cornwallis was transferred to the Suez Canal Patrol in company with the battleship Glory and Euryalus, which they joined on 4 January 1916. She operated as part of this patrol and on the East Indies Station until March 1916, including convoy duty in the Indian Ocean. She returned to the eastern Mediterranean in March 1916, and underwent a refit at Malta in May and June 1916. On 9 January 1917, Cornwallis was hit on her starboard side by a torpedo from German U-boat U-32, commanded by Kurt Hartwig, in the eastern Mediterranean, 60 nautical miles (110 km; 69 mi) east of Malta. Some of her stokeholds flooded, causing her to list about ten degrees to starboard, but counter-flooding corrected the list. She was also rendered immobilised, which made her an easy target for a second attack from U-32, which was able to evade the depth charge attack from Cornwallis's escorting destroyers. By this time, the British had begun preparations to take her under tow, but Hartwig launched another torpedo at long range. About 75 minutes after the first torpedo hit, another struck Cornwallis, also on the starboard side, and the ship rolled quickly to starboard. (Note: Burt mentions only two torpedo hits, but Preston says Cornwallis was hit by three torpedoes.) Fifteen men were killed in the torpedo explosions, but she stayed afloat long enough to get the rest of the crew off. She sank about 30 minutes after the second torpedo hit.
