= 12-pounder gun =

12-pounder gun or 12-pdr, usually denotes a gun which fired a projectile of approximately 12 pounds.

Guns of this type include:

- 12-pounder long gun, the naval muzzle-loader of the Age of Sail
- Canon de 12 de Vallière, French cannon of 1732
- Canon de 12 Gribeauval, French field cannon of the mid-late 18th century
- Canon lourd de 12 Gribeauval, French heavy cannon of the mid-late 18th century
- Canon obusier de 12, French 12-pounder cannon-howitzer of 1853. Known in the US as "12 pounder Napoleon"
- M1841 12-pounder howitzer, American howitzer having the same caliber (4.62 inches) as a 12-pounder field gun
- M1857 12-pounder Napoleon, American gun-howitzer of the American Civil War
- One of the Dahlgren guns of the American Civil War
- Ordnance BL 12 pounder 7 cwt, British field gun, 1885–1892
- Ordnance QF 12 pounder 8 cwt, British naval landing gun, late 19th century and early 20th century
- Ordnance BL 12 pounder 6 cwt, British light field gun, 1894–1916
- QF 12 pounder 12 cwt naval gun, British "Long 12" of 1890s–1940s
- QF 12 pounder 12 cwt AA gun, British AA gun of World War I
- QF 12 pounder 18 cwt naval gun, British naval gun of 1904–1920s
- RBL 12 pounder 8 cwt Armstrong gun, British field gun of 1859
- Twelve-pound cannon, cannon sized for a 12-pound ball, see Naval artillery in the Age of Sail
- 12-pounder Whitworth rifle, British rifled breechloader field gun of 1860s
- Erroneously, the QF 3 inch 20 cwt gun
