= SS Heroic =

History
- Name: (United Kingdom of Great Britain and Ireland) (1906-1914) SS Heroic; (United Kingdom) (1914-1920) HMS Heroic; (United Kingdom of Great Britain and Ireland) (1920-1930) SS Heroic; (United Kingdom of Great Britain and Ireland) (1930-1939) SS Lady Connaught; (United Kingdom of Great Britain and Ireland) (1939-1952) SS Longford
- Owner: (1906-1914) Belfast Steamship Company; (1914-1920) Royal Navy; (1920-1930) Belfast Steamship Company; (1930-1952) British and Irish Steam Packet Company
- Port of registry: (United Kingdom of Great Britain and Ireland) Belfast, United Kingdom
- Builder: Harland & Wolff
- Yard number: 378
- Launched: 13 January 1906
- Completed: 23 April 1906
- Acquired: 23 April 1906
- In service: 23 April 1906
- Out of service: 1952
- Identification: Official number: 120712
- Fate: Scrapped in 1952

General characteristics
- Type: (1906-1914) Ferry; (1914-1920) Armed merchant cruiser; (1920-1952) Ferry
- Tonnage: 2,016 GRT
- Length: 97.54 metres (320 ft 0 in)
- Beam: 12.50 metres (41 ft 0 in)
- Installed power: Two Quadruple expansion engines
- Propulsion: Two screws
- Sail plan: (1906-1914) Belfast - Liverpool; (1920-1930) Belfast - Liverpool; (1930-1938) Liverpool - Dublin; (1945-1952) Liverpool - Dublin
- Notes: Two masts, a single funnel (A dummy funnel was added following an overhaul in 1930)

SS Heroic was a British Ferry that served routes between Belfast, Liverpool and Dublin until her scrapping in 1952. She also served as an Armed merchant cruiser during World War I and was one of the rescue ships that came to the aid of the survivors of the sinking of the HMHS Britannic on 21 November 1916.

== Construction ==
Heroic was built as the older sistership of Graphic at the Harland & Wolff shipyard in Belfast, United Kingdom and launched on 13 January 1906 before being completed on 23 April 1906. The ship was 97.54 metres (320 ft 0 in) long and had a beam of 12.50 metres (41 ft 0 in). She was assessed at 2,016 GRT and had two Quadruple expansion engines driving two screw propellers.

== Career ==
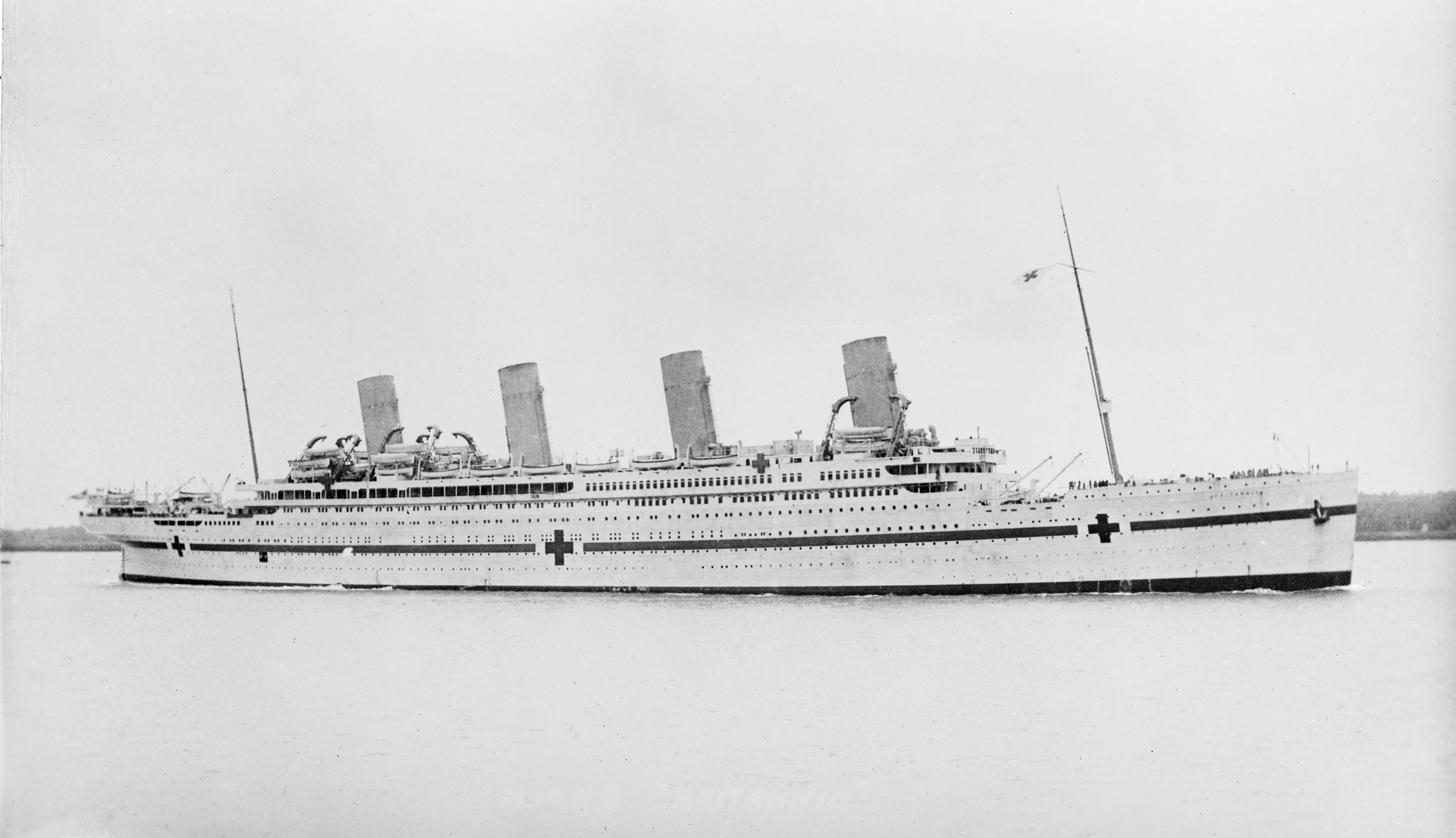
HMHS Britannic, the sister ship of RMS Titanic, as a hospital ship during World War I.

Heroic served the Belfast to Liverpool route as a Ferry from 1906 until she was requisitioned by the British Admiralty as an Armed merchant cruiser on 18 November 1914 following the outbreak of World War I. Heroic was serving in this role when, on the morning of 21 November 1916, Heroic and several other Royal Navy ships received a distress call from the HMHS Britannic which had struck a mine and was sinking in the Kea Channel. Heroic reached the wrecksite of Britannic at 10 am alongside HMS Foresight, HMS Foxhound, HMS Scourge and the French tug Goliath. Although the Britannic had already sunk an hour earlier, all her 1,066 occupants had taken to the lifeboats and safely evacuated save for two lifeboats which were drawn into the ship's still turning propellers, killing around 30 people. Heroic took on 494 survivors and, having run out of deck space to take on more people, left the wrecksite for Piraeus alongside the Scourge, while the other rescue ships picked up the remaining survivors. Two of the survivors Heroic had picked up died from injuries sustained in the sinking before the ship reached Piraeus and both were buried with military honours in the Piraeus Naval and Consular Cemetery.

Heroic remained in service as an Armed merchant cruiser until July 1917, when she was instead used as a troop transport until she was reverted back to an Armed merchant cruiser in January 1918. Heroic remained with the Royal Navy until 6 July 1920 and was returned to her owners so she could take up her former ferry duties between Belfast and Liverpool again. Heroic was withdrawn from her Ferry service in 1930 and given an extensive overhaul in which her aft boat deck was extended and a second dummy funnel was added to make her look more modern. The ship was then sold to the British and Irish Steam Packet Company and renamed Lady Connaught before returning to her original Belfast to Liverpool ferry route again. Lady Connaught was retired from service yet again in 1938 and renamed to Longford the following year. Longford was laid up during the entirety of World War II before she took up her ferry service again, but on the Liverpool to Dublin route this time. Longford was withdrawn from service a final time in 1952 and scrapped that same year.

== Bibliography ==
Chirnside, Mark (2011) [2004]. The Olympic-Class Ships. Stroud: Tempus. ISBN 978-0-7524-2868-0.
