= HMS Rattlesnake (1910) =

Destroyer of the Royal Navy

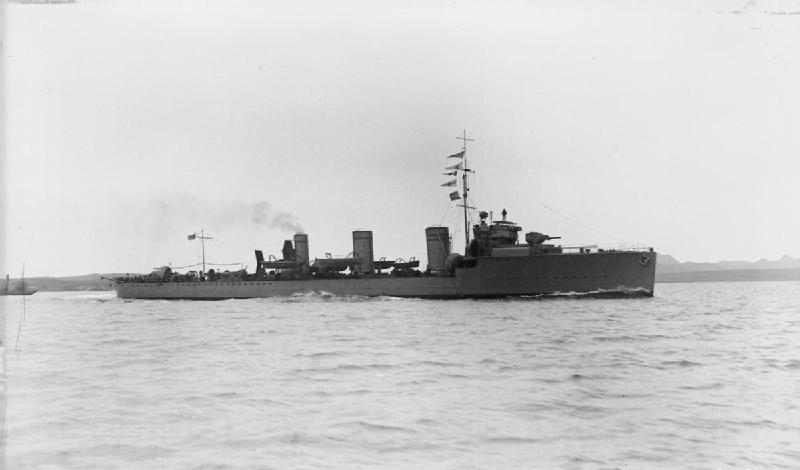
- Sister ship Scourge

History

United Kingdom
- Name: Rattlesnake
- Namesake: Rattlesnake
- Builder: Harland & Wolff, Glasgow
- Laid down: 9 April 1909
- Launched: 14 March 1910
- Completed: August 1910
- Out of service: 9 May 1921
- Fate: Sold to the broken up

General characteristics
- Class & type: Beagle-class destroyer
- Displacement: 925 long tons (940 t)
- Length: 270 ft 3 in (82.4 m)
- Beam: 27 ft 6 in (8.4 m)
- Draught: 16 ft 6 in (5 m)
- Installed power: 5 x coal-fired Yarrow boilers, 12,000 shp (8,900 kW)
- Propulsion: 3 x Parsons steam turbines driving 3 shafts
- Speed: 27 knots (50 km/h; 31 mph)
- Range: 2,000 nmi (3,700 km; 2,300 mi) at 15 kn (28 km/h; 17 mph)
- Complement: 96
- Armament: 1 × 4 in (102 mm) gun; 3 × 12 pdr 3 in (76 mm) guns; 2 × single 21 in (533 mm) torpedo tubes

HMS Rattlesnake was a Beagle-class (or G-class) destroyer of the British Royal Navy. The Beagle class were coal-fuelled ships, designed for a speed of 27 kn (31 mph; 50 km/h) and armed with a 4 in (102 mm) gun and two torpedo tubes. Built by Harland & Wolff and launched in 1910, Rattlesnake was transferred to the Mediterranean Fleet in 1913, and spent most of the First World War in the Mediterranean. In 1914, the ship was based at Malta, where there was an acute shortage of coal, and was sent on coaling expeditions to Bizerta for supplies. While participating in the Dardanelles campaign in 1915, the destroyer assisted the troops of the Australian First Division in both their advance and retreat, using a searchlight and guns to suppress troops of the Ottoman Army. The destroyer ended the war at Buncrana in the north of Ireland. After the Armistice that ended the war, Rattlesnake was initially transferred to Portsmouth and then sold in 1921 to be broken up.

== Design and development ==
Rattlesnake was one of three Beagle-class destroyers ordered as part of the 1908–1909 shipbuilding programme. The vessels were coal-burning after concerns had been raised about the availability of fuel oil in time of war and the bridge was larger and higher than previous designs. This reduced costs, although it also meant that five boilers were needed, the extra machinery meaning that deck space became more premium. Otherwise, the Beagle-class vessels were not built to a standard design, with detailed design being left to the builders of individual ships in accordance with a loose specification. The vessels were known as the G class from October 1913 as part of a wider renaming of the Royal Navy's warships into classes named alphabetically, although they did not change their names. It was not until the introduction of the L- or Laforey class that the destroyers' names matched the class designation.

Rattlesnake was 270 feet 3 inches (82.4 m) long, with a beam of 27 feet 6 inches (8.4 m) and a draught of 16 feet 6 inches (5 m). Normal displacement was 946 long tons (961 t). Five Yarrow boilers were fitted that fed steam to direct-drive Parsons turbines driving three shafts. Two funnels were fitted. The machinery was rated at 12,000 shaft horsepower (8,900 kW) giving a design speed of 27 knots (31 mph; 50 km/h). The destroyer reached a speed of 27.034 kn (31.110 mph; 50.067 km/h) during sea trials. Up to 226 long tons (230 t) of coal was carried, giving a design range of 2,000 nautical miles (3,700 km; 2,300 mi) at 15 knots (28 km/h; 17 mph).

Armament consisted of one 4 in (102 mm) BL Mk VIII gun forward and three 3 in (76 mm) QF 12-pounder 12 cwt guns aft. (Note: "Cwt" is the abbreviation for hundredweight, 12cwt referring to the weight of the gun.) Torpedo armament consisted of two 21 in (533 mm) torpedo tubes, one placed forward and the other aft. Two spare torpedoes were carried. On 8 April 1916, the Admiralty approved fitting the destroyer with depth charges. Initially, two charges were carried. This was increased to 30 to 50 charges during 1918. The ship had a complement of 96 officers and ratings.

== Construction and career ==
Laid down at Harland & Wolff's Glasgow shipyard on 9 April 1909, Rattlesnake was launched on 14 March the following year and completed during August. The ship was the ninth of the name to serve in the Royal Navy, named after the venomous snake. The vessel joined the Second Destroyer Flotilla. In 1912, a reorganisation of the Home Fleet resulted in the ships of the Beagle class forming the Third Destroyer Flotilla. Rattlesnake remained part of the Third Destroyer Flotilla in March 1913 but, on 31 October, was transferred, along with the rest of the class, to the newly-formed Fifth Destroyer Flotilla as part of the Mediterranean Fleet.

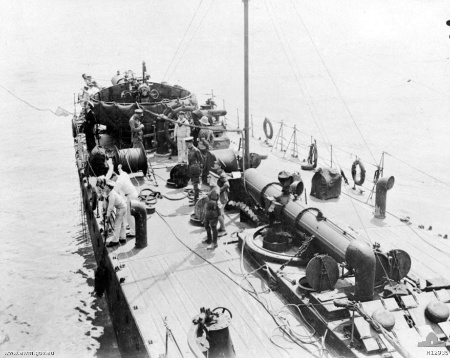
Sir Ian Hamilton, commander of the Mediterranean Expeditionary Force during the Dardanelles Campaign, aboard Rattlesnake in April 1915

As the First World War approached, the destroyer was part of the Fourth Division of the Fifth Destroyer Flotilla and based in Alexandria. The flotilla arrived at Malta on 29 July. The island had a coal shortage, which restricted the vessel's activity. Nonetheless, on 2 August 1914, the destroyer escorted a small fleet led by the battlecruiser Inflexible, and including sister ship Savage, as part of the search for Goeben and Breslau. On 5 August, the vessel accompanied Inflexible''s sister ship Indomitable and Savage on a more successful sortie to Bizerta to coal, rejoining the fleet the following day. Savage and Rattlesnake were back the following day for more coal, but nonetheless the fuel shortage continued to curtail action by the whole flotilla. The attempts to intercept Goeben and Breslau failed, and the two German ships reached Turkey on 10 August. On 10 September, Rattlesnake transported Rear Admiral Ernest Troubridge back to England to give an account of their escape.

In 1915 Rattlesnake participated in the naval operations in the Dardanelles Campaign. Notable was an action supporting the Australian First Division on 27 May at Kabatepe. Turning the ship's searchlight onto the coast, the crew identified the Ottoman Army trenches and opened fire. A large communications line was destroyed, enabling the troops to advance. The destroyer returned to the same location during the evening of 18 December and, once again using a combination of a searchlight and guns, supported the evacuation of the same division. The next year saw Rattlesnake still a member of the Fifth Destroyer Flotilla within the Mediterranean Fleet. Submarine action by the Imperial German Navy in the Mediterranean Sea was intensifying, with a commensurate impact on British shipping. In February alone, fifty ships, totalling 101,000 long tons (103,000 t), were lost. Due to a lack of resources, the destroyers in the Mediterranean Fleet could only escort high value ships, like troopships.

Rattlesnake was still based in the Mediterranean in 1917 and was subsequently transferred to the Aegean Squadron. On 20 January the following year, the destroyer was detached from the squadron to serve at Gibraltar. Rattlesnake was subsequently transferred to the Second Destroyer Flotilla, based at Buncrana in the north of Ireland. The destroyers at Buncrana assisted convoys travelling across the Atlantic Ocean to and from the American industrial complex at Hampton Roads, sailing via Sydney, Nova Scotia to arrive and depart ports on the Clyde and Mersey. The service was demanding, but succeeded in bringing many ships safely to port.

After the Armistice that ended the war, the Royal Navy quickly withdrew all pre-war destroyers from active service. By February 1919, Rattlesnake had been transferred to Portsmouth. However, that deployment did not last long. As the force returned to a peacetime level of strength, both the number of ships and personnel needed to be reduced to save money. Rattlesnake was declared superfluous to operational requirements, retired, and, on 9 May 1921, sold to Ward at Milford Haven to be broken up.

== Pennant numbers ==
Pennant numbers
Pennant number	Date
D94	February 1915
HC7	September 1918
F96	January 1919
