= HMS Savage (1910) =

Destroyer of the Royal Navy

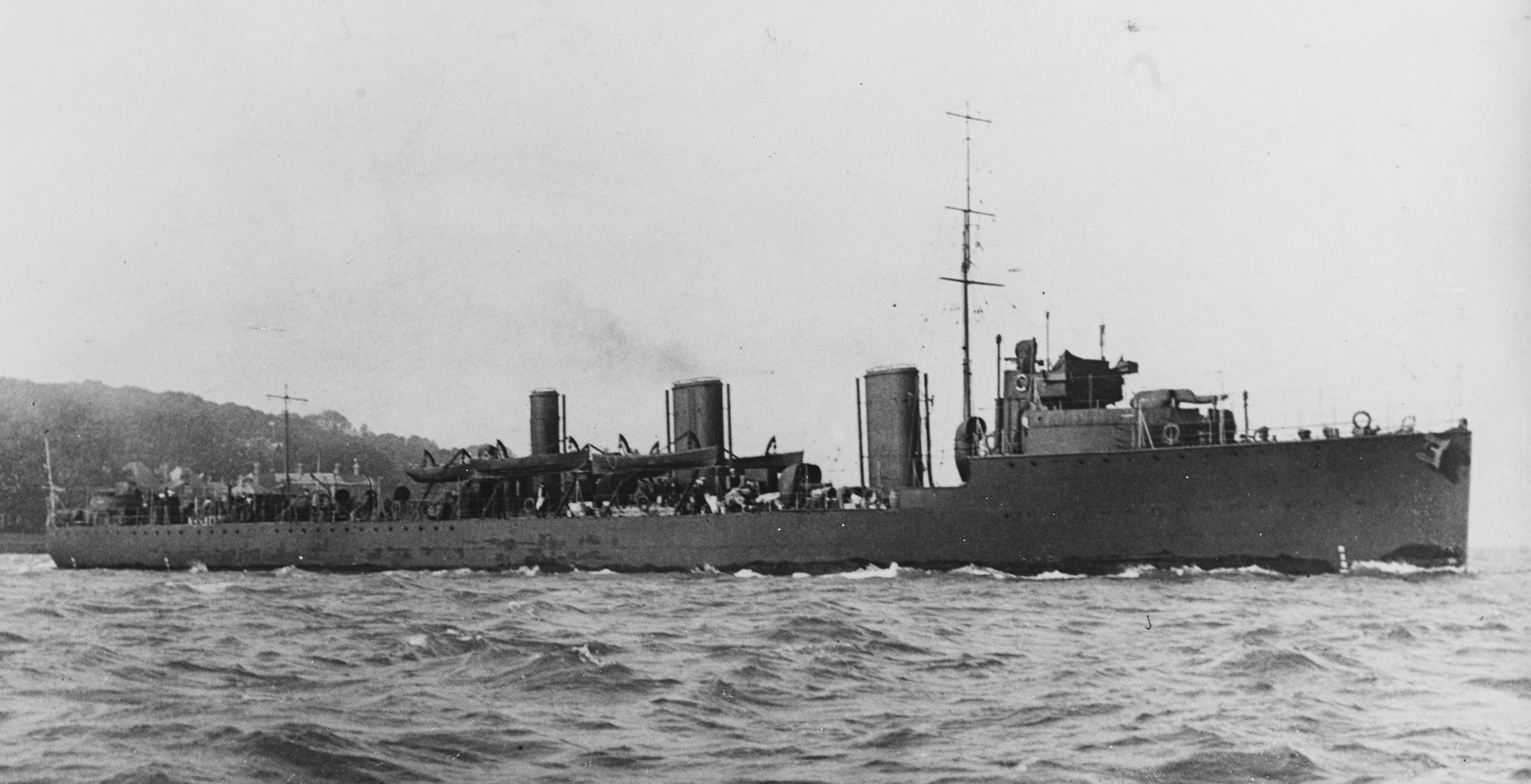
- Sister ship Basilisk

History

United Kingdom
- Name: Savage
- Builder: Thornycroft, Woolston
- Laid down: 2 March 1909
- Launched: 10 March 1910
- Completed: August 1910
- Out of service: 9 May 1921
- Fate: Sold to the broken up

General characteristics
- Class & type: Beagle-class destroyer
- Displacement: 897 long tons (911 t) (normal)
- Length: 263 ft 1 in (80.2 m)
- Beam: 28 ft 1 in (8.6 m)
- Draught: 16 ft 6 in (5 m)
- Installed power: 5 x coal-fired Yarrow boilers, 12,000 shp (8,900 kW)
- Propulsion: 3 x Parsons steam turbines driving 3 shafts
- Speed: 27 kn (50 km/h; 31 mph)
- Range: 2,000 nmi (3,700 km; 2,300 mi) at 15 knots (28 km/h; 17 mph)
- Complement: 96
- Armament: 1 × 4 in (102 mm) gun; 3 × 12 pdr 3 in (76 mm) guns; 2 × single 21 in (533 mm) torpedo tubes

HMS Savage was a Beagle-class (later G-class) destroyer of the British Royal Navy. The Beagles were coal-fuelled ships, designed for a speed of 27 kn (31 mph; 50 km/h) and armed with a 4 in (102 mm) gun and two torpedo tubes. Built by Thornycroft and launched in 1910, Savage was initially commissioned into the First Destroyer Flotilla at Portsmouth. In 1912, the warship joined the Third Destroyer Flotilla before being transferred to the Mediterranean Fleet as part of the Fifth Destroyer Flotilla in 1913. As the First World War approached, the destroyer was based in Alexandria, Egypt, but was swiftly redeployed to Malta, and was involved in the unsuccessful search for the German warships Goeben and Breslau. After this, Savage was deployed to Port Said to escort troopships to the Suez Canal. The destroyer subsequently returned to the North Sea and was involved in recovering the bodies of the crew from the pre-dreadnought battleship Formidable. After the Armistice of 1918 that ended the war, Savage was initially transferred to the Nore and then sold in 1921 to be broken up.

== Design and development ==
Savage was one of the Beagle-class destroyers ordered by the Admiralty as part of the 1908–1909 shipbuilding programme for the Royal Navy. The bridge was larger and higher than previous designs and the vessels were coal-burning after concerns had been raised about the availability of fuel oil in time of war. This reduced costs, although it also meant that five boilers were needed, the extra machinery meaning that there was less space on the deck for equipment. They were the last coal-fired destroyers used by the navy. The Beagle class vessels were not built to a standard design, with detailed design being left to the builders of individual ships in accordance with a loose specification, in this case by John I. Thornycroft & Company. In October 1913, as part of a wider renaming of the Royal Navy's warships into classes named alphabetically, the class was renamed as the G-class.

Savage was 263 ft 1 in (80.2 m) long, with a beam of 28 ft 1 in (8.6 m) and a draught of 16 ft 6 in (5 m). Normal displacement was 897 long tons (911 t). Five Yarrow boilers fed direct-drive Parsons steam turbines driving three shafts. Two funnels were fitted. The machinery was rated at 12,000 shaft horsepower (8,900 kW) giving a design speed of 27 kn (31 mph; 50 km/h). During sea trials, the destroyer reached a speed of 27.161 kn (31.256 mph; 50.302 km/h) at a displacement of 950 long tons (970 t). Up to 226 long tons (230 t) of coal was carried, giving a design range of 2,000 nautical miles (3,700 km; 2,300 mi) at 15 knots (28 km/h; 17 mph). The ship had a complement of 96 officers and ratings.

Armament consisted of one 4 in (102 mm) BL Mk VIII gun forward and three 3 in (76 mm) QF 12-pounder 12 cwt guns aft. (Note: "Cwt" is the abbreviation for hundredweight, 12cwt referring to the weight of the gun.) Torpedo armament consisted of two 21 in (533 mm) torpedo tubes, one placed forward and the other aft. Two spare torpedoes were carried. On 8 April 1916, the Admiralty approved fitting the destroyer with depth charges. Initially, two depth charge launchers and two charges were carried. The number increased in service and, by 1918, the vessel was typically carrying between 30 and 50 depth charges.

== Construction and career ==
Laid down at Thornycroft's shipyard in Woolston near Southampton on 2 March 1909, Savage was launched on 10 March the following year and completed during August. The ship was the seventh of the name to serve in the Royal Navy. The vessel joined the First Destroyer Flotilla. In 1912, a reorganisation of the Home Fleet resulted in the ships of the Beagle class forming the Third Destroyer Flotilla. The vessel remained part of the Third Flotilla in March 1913. Along with the rest of the class,Savage was transferred to the newly-formed Fifth Destroyer Flotilla as part of the Mediterranean Fleet in November.

In 1914, as the First World War approached, the destroyer was part of the Fourth Division of the Fifth Destroyer Flotilla and based in Alexandria. The flotilla arrived at Malta on 29 July. The island had a coal shortage, which restricted the vessel's activity. Nonetheless, on 2 August, the destroyer escorted a small fleet led by the battlecruiser Inflexible, and including sister ship Rattlesnake, as part of the search for the German battlecruiser Goeben and light cruiser Breslau. On 5 August, the vessel accompanied Inflexible's sister ship Indomitable and Rattlesnake on a sortie to Bizerta to coal, rejoining the fleet the following day. Savage and Rattlesnake were back the following day for more coal, but nonetheless the fuel shortage continued to curtail action by the whole flotilla. The attempts to intercept Goeben and Breslau failed, and the two German ships reached Turkey on 10 August.

On 29 October, alongside sister ship Scourge, Savage was dispatched by Vice-Admiral Sackville Carden to join the Eastern Mediterranean Squadron at Port Said to provide convoy protection in the Gulf of Aqaba. The admiral was most concerned that minefields had been laid in the path of ships travelling to the Suez Canal. This was considered particularly important as it coincided with the arrival of the first ships carrying the first troops of the Australian and New Zealand Army Corps. From there, the vessel escorted the protected cruiser Minerva on a bombardment of German troops at Aqaba. On 10 November, along with Basilisk, Racoon and Scourge, the destroyer sailed for Tenedos. The destroyer helped protect the Suez Canal from potential incursion from the Ottoman Empire.

By 26 November, the destroyers of the Beagle class had been withdrawn from the Mediterranean to create a flotilla that would operate as escorts in the North Sea. A division of the class was dispatched to Devonport. The ships were immediately assigned to Portsmouth to patrol between Winchelsea and Poole. The destroyer was one of those called out on the night of 1 January 1916 to search for the survivors from the pre-dreadnought battleship Formidable. Arriving early in the morning of 2 January, Savage did not find anyone alive but recovered six bodies from the sea. The vessel remained in escort duty for the next few months, escorting troopships from Newhaven.

By April, the vessel had joined the rest of the class in the naval operations in the Dardanelles Campaign. Savage stayed with the Eastern Mediterranean Squadron through 1916 and into 1917 as a member of the Fifth Destroyer Flotilla within the Mediterranean Fleet. The need for destroyer escorts was increasing dramatically as the German navy introduced unrestricted submarine warfare. By June, the submarines were sinking 14,200 long tons (14,400 t) of shipping a month. In response, the Admiralty introduced convoys on major routes, including those between Malta and Egypt. As the following year opened, the destroyer was in dock for repairs.

After the Armistice of 11 November 1918 that ended the war, the Royal Navy quickly withdrew all pre-war destroyers from active service. By February 1919, Savage was based at Portsmouth, but was under a skeleton command. However, that deployment did not last long. As the force returned to a peacetime level of strength, both the number of ships and personnel needed to be reduced to save money. Declared superfluous to operational requirements, Savage was retired, and, on 9 May 1921, sold to Ward at Portishead to be broken up.

== Pennant numbers ==
Pennant numbers
Pennant number	Date
D92	February 1915
HA9	January 1918
F97	January 1919
