= Gustav Sieß =

German military officer (1883–1970)

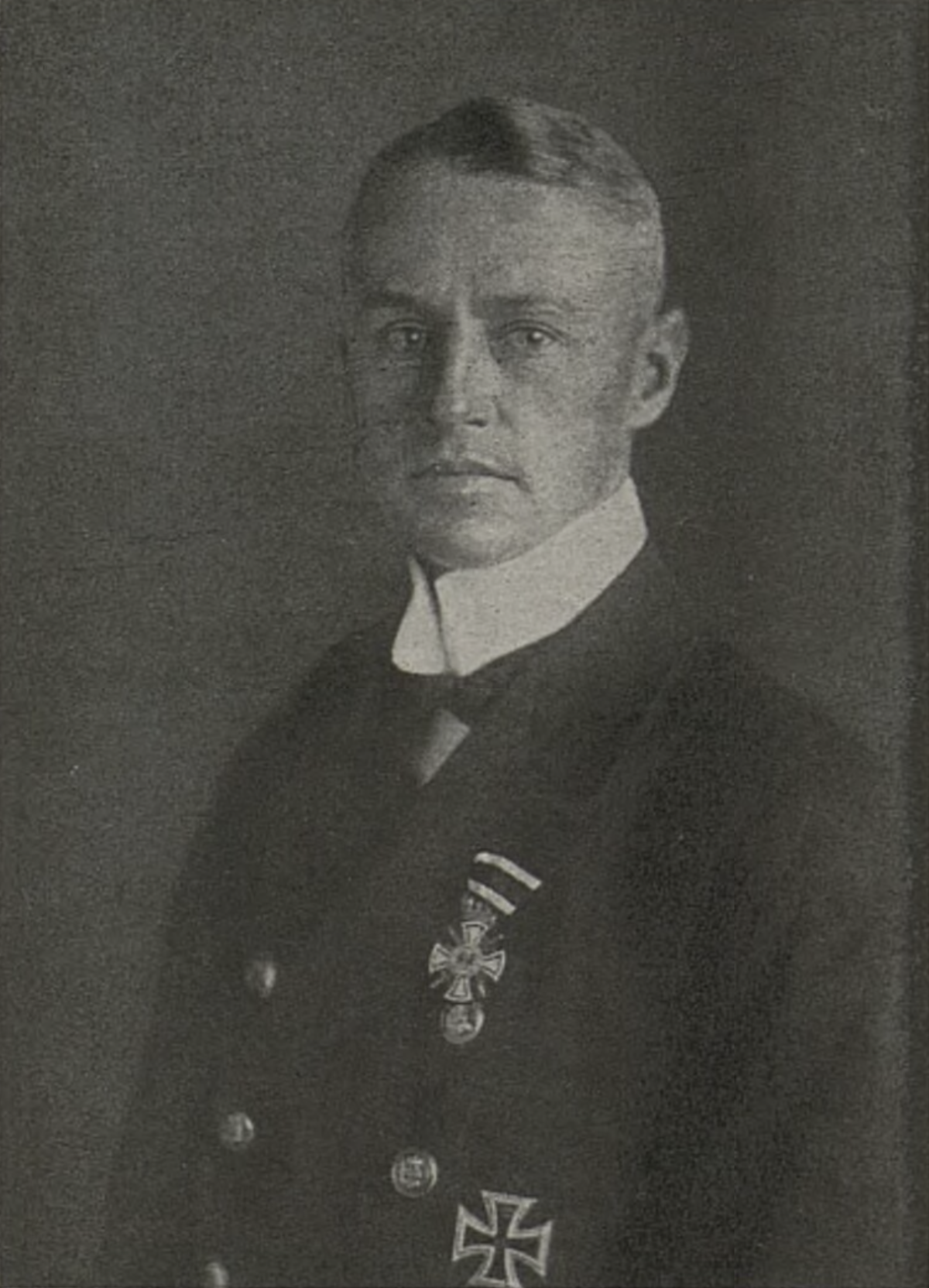
- Gustav Sieß (c. 1918)
- Born: 11 December 1883; Hamburg, German Empire
- Died: 14 October 1970 (aged 86); Hamburg, West Germany
- Military career
- Allegiance: German Empire (1902-1919); Nazi Germany (1935-1944)
- Branch: Kaiserliche Marine; Luftwaffe
- Service years: Kaiserliche Marine (1902 – 1919); Luftwaffe (1935-1944)
- Rank: Korvettenkapitän (Kaiserliche Marine); Generalleutnant (Luftwaffe)
- Commands: U-73, 9 October 1915 – 21 May 1917; U-33, 1 April 1917 – 18 August 1918; U-65, 19 August 1918 – 29 September 1918; U-33 (Second command), 19 October 1918 – 11 November 1918
- Conflicts: World War I; U-boat Campaign; World War II
- Awards: Pour le Mérite; Iron Cross First & Second Class; Royal House Order of Hohenzollern; Order of the Crown (Prussia); Lifesaving Medal (Prussia); Hanseatic Cross (Hamburg)

Generalleutnant Gustav Sieß (born 11 December 1883 in Hamburg – died 14 October 1970 in Hamburg) was a Kapitänleutnant of the German Kaiserliche Marine during World War I and Oberstleutnant in the Luftwaffe during World War II. He is most known for being the commander of the U-73 which lay the mine that sank RMS Titanic's sister ship HMHS Britannic on 21 November 1916. Sieß sank a total of 53 ships and 3 warships during his career in the Kaiserliche Marine worth 188,295 tons, making him the 6th most successful submarine commander of World War I.

== Early career ==
The Training ship SMS Moltke during the 1890s.

Sieß joined the German Kaiserliche Marine as a Seekadett on 1 April 1902 and was trained aboard the training ship SMS Moltke and in the Naval Academy in Mürwik. After completing his training in October 1904, Sieß served aboard the armored cruiser SMS Hansa in Southeast Asia for two years before returning to Germany with the rank of Leutnant zur See. Upon his return in 1906, Sieß became a company officer in the 1st Torpedo Division in Kiel while also serving as watch officer on various torpedo boats for another two years. In 1908, Sieß was transferred to the mine warfare division in Cuxhaven and held the command over minesweepers S-27, S-25 and S-38 before being promoted to Oberleutnant zur See on 30 March 1908. From 1 October 1910 until November 1912, Sieß served as adjutant to the Inspectorate of Coastal Artillery and Mine Warfare whereupon he gained a posting as a company officer in the 2nd Torpedo Division in Wilhelmshaven. During this time, Sieß obtained the command of the torpedo boat SMS V3 before also commanding the SMS V1. Sieß was promoted to Kapitänleutnant on 12 April 1913 and saved a crew member from drowning that same year. For his heroic actions, Sieß was awarded the Lifesaving Medal which was personally handed to him by Kaiser Wilhelm II.

=== World War I ===
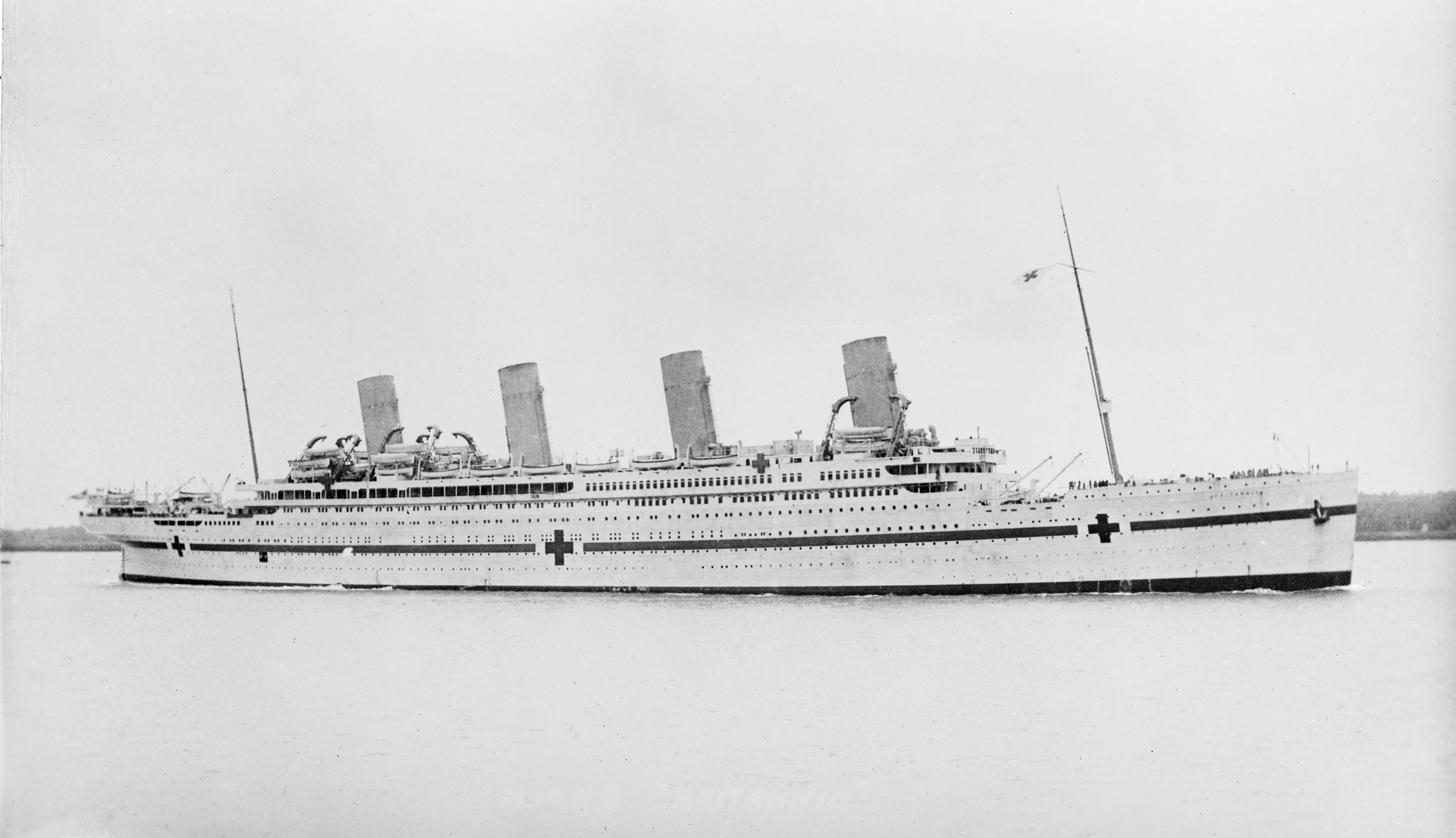
The Hospital ship HMHS Britannic during World War I.

Sieß underwent submarine training from March 1915 until August 1915, during which he briefly served as an intelligence officer aboard U-41. He received his first command of a U-boat on 9 October 1915 on board U-73, and served as part of the Baltic Flotilla which was based in Kiel before being transferred to the Mediterranean Flotilla which was based in Pola. During his command of U-73 from 9 October 1915 to 21 May 1917, Sieß sank 16 ships including the Armed merchant cruiser Burdigala, the Hospital Ship Britannic (The largest ship sunk during the entire war) and the British Battleship HMS Russell, and damaged four other ships. Sieß remained in the Mediterranean Flotilla when he was transferred to command U-33 on 1 April 1917 and served on her until 18 August 1918, sinking a total of 36 ships and damaging five others for which he received the Pour le Mérite on 24 April 1918. Sieß subsequently commanded U-65 from 19 August 1918 to 29 September 1918, sinking four ships and damaging one other, before he returned to command U-33 on 19 October 1918 until the end of the war.

== Interbellum ==
Following the end of the war on 11 November 1918, Sieß was placed at the disposal of the Kaiserliche Marine and appointed commander of the 9th Minesweeping Half-Flotilla on 1 April 1919. On 28 August 1919, Sieß was placed at the disposal of the commander of the Marinestation der Ostsee before being discharged from the Navy on 11 November 1919. Sieß was awarded the honorary rank of Korvettenkapitän on 22 February 1920 for his service during the war. In his civilian life, Sieß formed a commercial company (Siess, von Loë & Co.) and served as a board member of Klein-Michel-Motorbau AG in Hamburg in 1925. Sieß was also a member of the Stahlhelm-Fraktion and led the Hamburg district naval department. After receiving training to become a pilot in 1935, Sieß returned to military service as a Major in the Luftwaffe and became head of logistics at the Reich Air Ministry in Berlin. Sieß also served as deputy commander of Air Ordnance Group 1 until becoming its commander following his promotion to Oberstleutnant on 18 January 1938.

== World War II ==
Following the outbreak of World War II in 1939, Sieß retained his position in the Ministry and was transferred to active service following his promotion to Generalmajor on 1 November 1940. After falling seriously ill, Sieß was transferred to the Führerreserve on 23 September 1943 and promoted to Generalleutnant on 1 April 1944 before Sieß was discharged from military service on 30 April as his health had not improved. After the end of the war in 1945, Sieß was arrested by Soviet troops on 15 June 1945 and sentenced in court to 25 years in prison.

== Later Life & Death ==
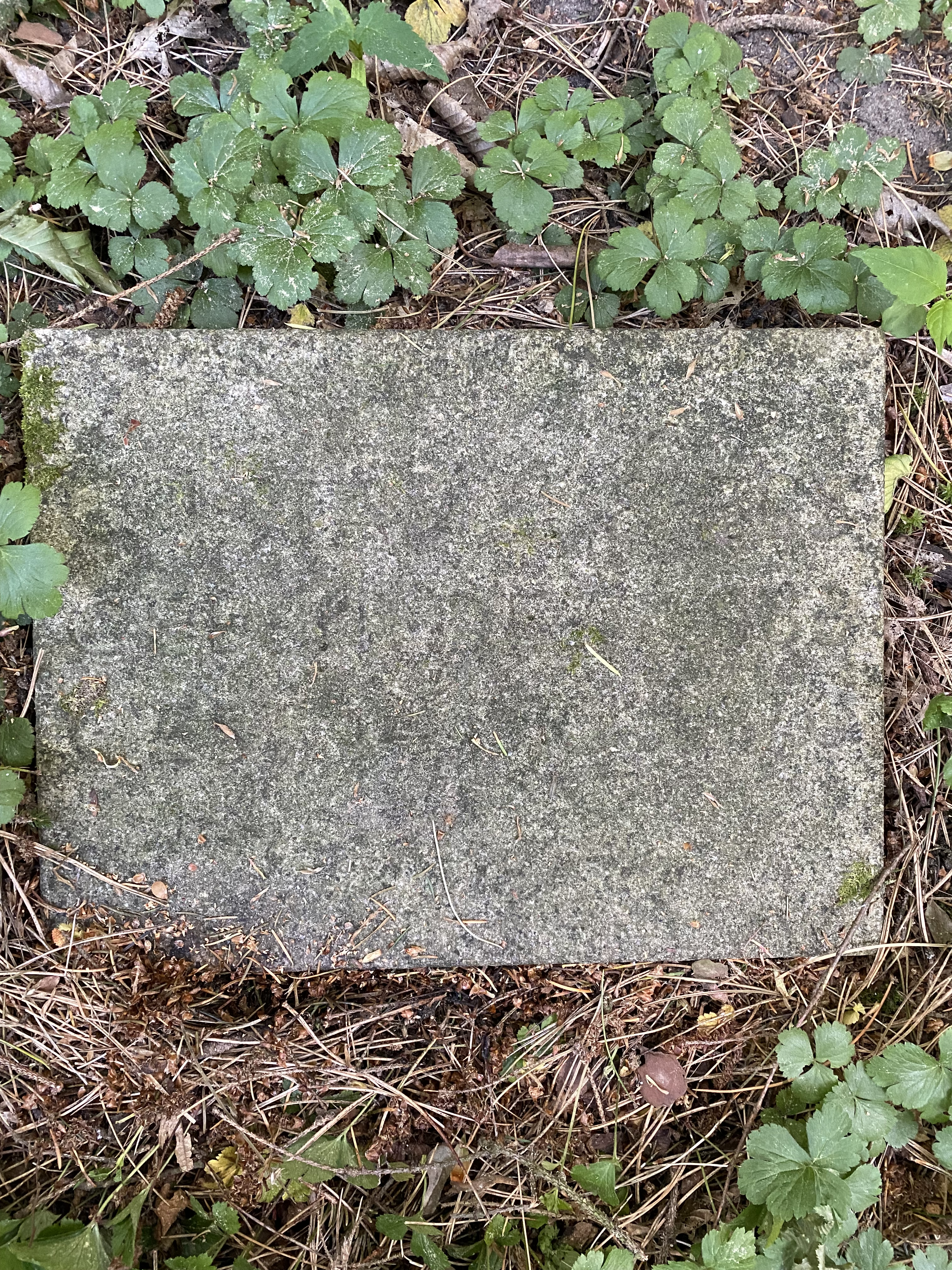
Sieß' tombstone in Hamburg.

Despite his original prison sentence, Sieß was released after serving only ten years on 8 October 1955 and returned to his home in Hamburg where he died on 14 October 1970 at the age of 86. He was buried at the Ohlsdorf Cemetery in Hamburg.

== In popular culture ==
Sieß is portrayed in the 2017 TV movie The Mystery of Britannic, where he is played by actor Michael Ihnow.
