= Sheila Macbeth Mitchell =

British local historian (1890–1994)

Sheila Macbeth Mitchell (1890–1994) was a British nurse and local historian. While serving as a nurse in World War I, she survived the wreck of the HMHS Britannic, later returning to explore the wreck with Jacques Cousteau at the age of 86. She was awarded an MBE in 1980 for her services to genealogy, which included publishing twelve volumes recording the monumental inscriptions of Scottish churchyards along with her husband.

== Life ==
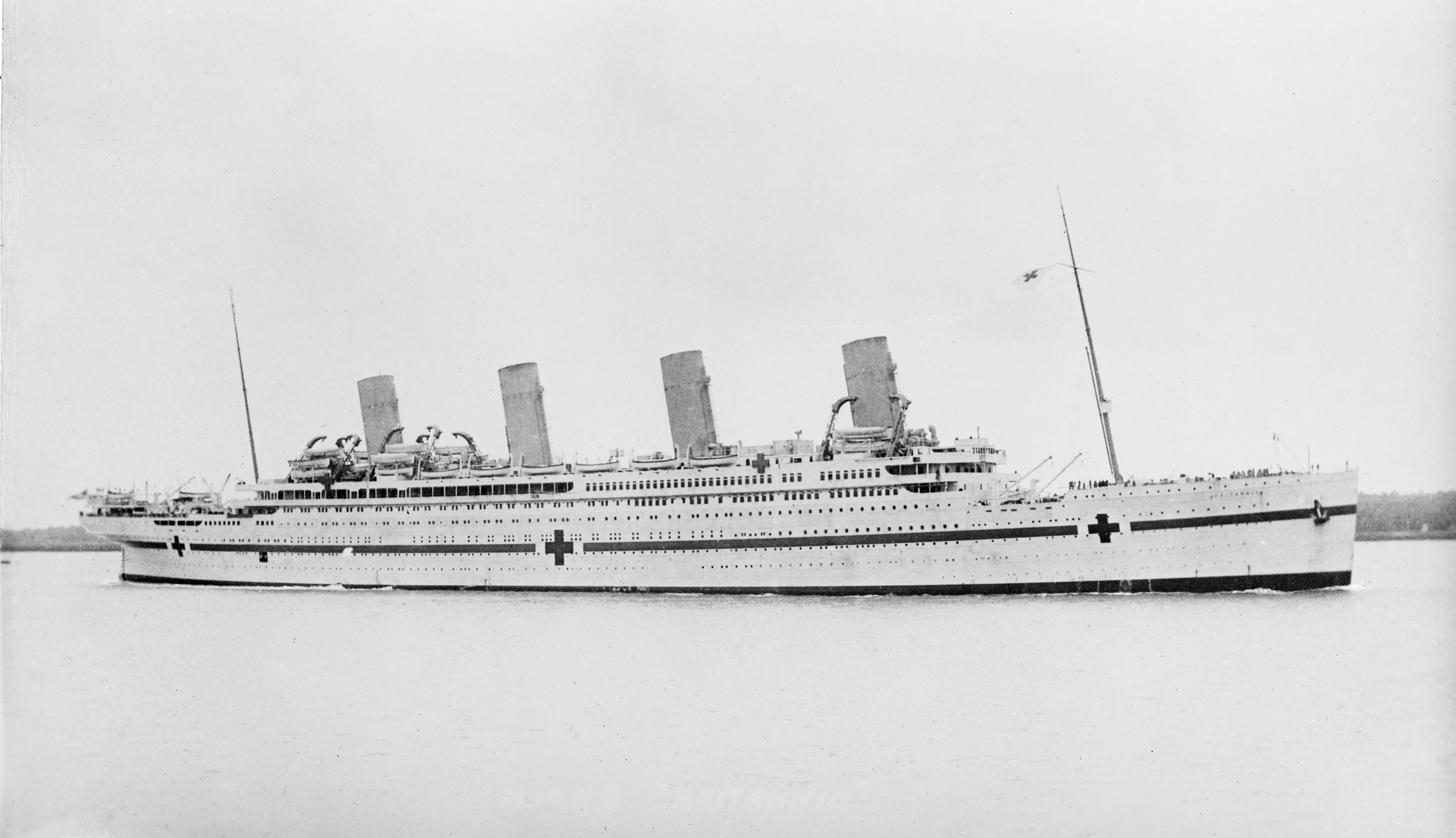
HMHS Britannic

Sheila was born 12 June 1890 in Bolton, Lancashire, to Scottish parents and educated at Polam Hall School, Darlington. Her sister was the textile artist Ann Macbeth. A keen golfer, Sheila wanted to become a teacher of physical education, but was dissuaded from working by her parents.

=== World War I ===
During World War I, Sheila trained as a nurse at the London Hospital. She served as an auxiliary in Queen Alexandra’s Imperial Military Hospital Nursing Services.

In November 1916, Sheila was serving on the HMHS Britannic, the sister ship of the Titanic, which had been requisitioned as a hospital ship. The ship departed from Southampton on its way to pick up wounded soldiers and to deliver medical staff to Malta. On the morning of 21 November, between the Greek islands of Kea and Makronissos, the Britannic was struck by either a torpedo or a mine. Sheila escaped on a lifeboat. After three hours, the lifeboat was picked up by the Scourge, a torpedo destroyer. They stayed for 17 days on Malta, then were taken back to England by the HMHS Valdivia. Sheila and her roommate Violet Jessop wrote eyewitness accounts of the shipwreck: Sheila's scrapbook was digitised by Capital Collections.

Sheila was then posted to No. 2 British Stationary Hospital in France from January 1917 to November 1918.

=== Interwar life ===
Sheila briefly worked as a housekeeper for her brother at Four Oaks. In 1919, on a holiday to Switzerland, Sheila met John Fowler Mitchell, a member of the Indian Civil Service. They married in 1920 and lived in India, where they had four children, until John’s retirement in 1935.

=== Genealogical work ===
Between 1950 and 1980, Sheila and John Mitchell recorded pre-1955 monumental inscriptions in kirkyards in eight Scottish counties. They published twelve volumes of this research in 1967–75 as a resource for family history. Two of their children, Alison and Angus, continued the project. The pair are commemorated with a bench in the Archivists' Garden at the National Records in Scotland.

Sheila also contributed to the work of the Scottish Genealogical Society by transcribing Poll Tax and Hearth Tax records. She was appointed MBE for her services to genealogy in 1980.

=== 'In Search of the Britannic' ===
In 1976, Sheila answered a call from Jacques Cousteau for his film 'Cousteau's Odyssey'. She provided Cousteau with an eyewitness interview and explored the wreck in a mini submarine. Sheila travelled on a six-week publicity tour for the film in the United States.

She died on 15 February 1994 in Batheaston at the age of 103.
