= HMHS Letitia (1912) =

Hospital ship

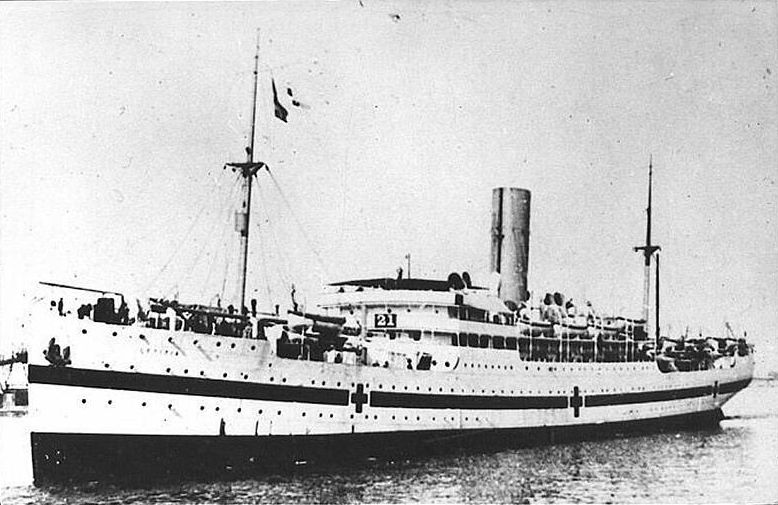
- HMHS Letitia during her service as a hospital ship in World War I

History

United Kingdom
- Name: SS Letitia (1912-1914); HMHS Letitia (1914-1917)
- Namesake: Letitia was the Latin name given to the then Roman city of Paris
- Owner: Donaldson Line
- Port of registry: United Kingdom, Glasgow
- Route: Glasgow - Quebec - Montreal
- Ordered: 1912
- Builder: Scott´s Shipbuilding & Engineering Co.
- Yard number: 437
- Laid down: 1912
- Launched: 21 February 1912
- Maiden voyage: 4 May 1912
- In service: 4 May 1912
- Identification: HVQJ; Official number: 133033
- Fate: Ran aground and sank 1 August 1917

General characteristics
- Type: Passenger ship/Hospital ship
- Tonnage: 8,991 GRT
- Length: 143.3 metres (470 ft 2 in)
- Beam: 17.3 metres (56 ft 9 in)
- Depth: 8.8 metres (28 ft 10 in)
- Installed power: 2 Triple Expansion Engine
- Propulsion: Double screw propellers
- Sail plan: Glasgow - Quebec - Montreal
- Speed: 14 knots
- Capacity: 1.250 passengers; Second Class: 300; Third Class: 950
- Crew: 137

HMHS Letitia was a British hospital ship that ran aground at Portuguese Cove in Halifax Harbour, Canada on 1 August 1917 while carrying 546 wounded Canadian soldiers from Liverpool, United Kingdom to Halifax, Nova Scotia, Canada.

== Construction ==
HMHS Letitia was built as SS Letitia at the Scott's Shipbuilding & Engineering Co. shipyard in Greenock, Scotland in 1912. She was launched on 21 February 1912, and completed by May of the same year. The ship was 143.3 metres (470 ft 2 in) long, had a beam of 17.3 metres (56 ft 9 in) and had a depth of 8.8 metres (28 ft 10 in). She was assessed at 8.991 GRT and had 2 triple expansion engines driving double screw propellers. The engine was rated at 962 nhp and the ship could reach a maximum speed of 14 knots.

== Early career ==
The SS Letitia made her maiden voyage from Glasgow to Quebec and Montreal and kept sailing on that line until the outbreak of the First World War. She had place to accommodate 1.387 passengers and crew and she sometimes also carried mail as cargo.

== World War I ==
After the start of The Great War, SS Letitia was commandeered by the British Admiralty on 18 November 1914 for service as a Hospital Ship or Ambulance Transport and placed under the command of the Canadian Army Medical Corps. She was retrofitted to provide the latest in medical care and comfort for her patients. She had a full complement of medical and nursing staff with access to all of the equipment available in a state-of-the-art hospital. All Hospital ships were distinctively painted in white with a green stripe down the side and three red crosses on each side as well, this was done to differentiate these "non-combatant" vessels from other shipping. But sometimes even these non-combatants became targets of enemy submarines. Letitia was given the prefix HMHS, which stands for His Majesty's Hospital Ship, for her new service as a hospital ship.

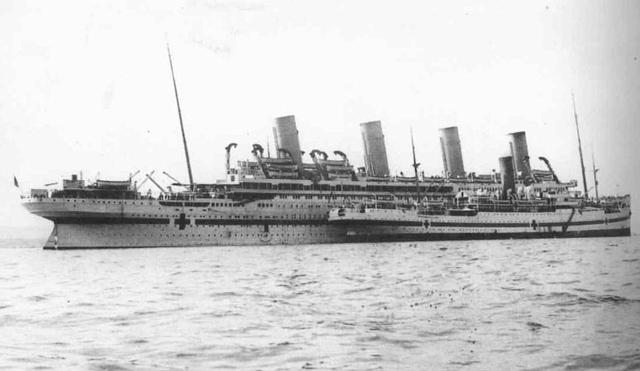
HMHS Letitia alongside HMHS Britannic, 1916

HMHS Letitia first served with distinction in the Mediterranean and even came under fire while evacuating wounded troops near the Dardanelles. The Hospital ship conducted her first rescue at sea when she came across the sinking SS City of Birmingham on 27 November 1916 some 90 nautical miles (170 km) south east of Malta. The cargo liner had been torpedoed by the German Submarine SM U-32 and later sunk with the loss of four lives. HMHS Letitia picked up all the survivors and sailed back to safety.

The Letitia was relocated from the Mediterranean to the Atlantic in 1917 and her new task consisted of bringing wounded Canadian soldiers stationed in the United Kingdom back to their homes in Canada. The hospital ship made a total of five voyages from Liverpool, United Kingdom to Halifax, Nova Scotia, Canada, bringing a total of 2,600 wounded Canadian soldiers back home.

=== Sinking ===
HMHS Letitia set sail from Liverpool in late July 1917 for its ninth run with a full crew of 137 men, 74 hospital staff (including 12 nurses) and 546 wounded Canadian soldiers on board. Letitia had been in service as a hospital ship for nearly three years.

The crossing was made without incident until the morning of 1 August 1917, when fog appeared off the coast of Nova Scotia. The visibility was reduced to near zero, but Lt. Col. David Donald continued on his course and posted several crew members to listen for whistles, buoy bells or foghorn blasts, to avoid hazards including the dangerous shoals that flank the entrance to Halifax Harbour.

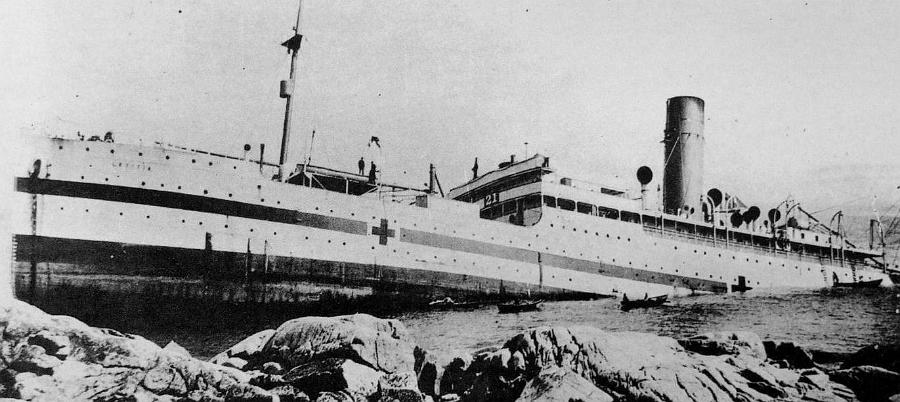
HMHS Letitia on the rocks around October 1917

The captain had used the navigational method of dead reckoning to estimate his position when he heard a whistle of an approaching pilot boat. The pilot came aboard to guide the Letitia through the fog, between the unseen buoys and into the harbour. The pilot continued the course, not realizing that the captain had incorrectly estimated the ship's position. Ten minutes after the pilot boarded the ship, the captain saw a dark area in fog approaching and ordered the ship full astern. The order however, came too late and the Letitia abruptly stopped as it ran aground on Portuguese Cove in Halifax Harbour. Lt. Col. Donald tried to reverse the engines to free the ship, but the holds were perforated, putting the ship in danger of breaking up if it did slide off the shoal, potentially sinking with the wounded still on board.

The Captain immediately called for assistance to evacuate the ship, and the soldiers disembarked without incident onto nearby ships. The captain and crew stayed on board until the next morning, when the ship began to list and the captain ordered the ship to be abandoned. The Letitia split in two in the months following the grounding and her stern sank into deeper waters. Much of her equipment was removed by legal salvagers and by looters before the ship sank completely.

== Aftermath and wreck ==
All passengers and medical staff were saved, but there was one fatality among the crew, a stoker who was accidentally left on the ship and who drowned while trying to swim ashore. At the inquiry, Captain McNeil testified that he had fully trusted that the pilot knew where the buoys were, particularly because the pilots were in charge of moving the buoys to protect the harbour during wartime. The pilot was found guilty of a gross error of judgment and demoted.

The wreck of the Letitia remains near the entrance to Halifax Harbour just south of Portuguese Cove at a depth of 37 metres (121 ft) and is a popular recreational dive site. The wreckage is scattered over the bottom and is lying on a steeply sloping shelf, with a sudden drop off. When looking down, you can see a boiler and a section of the stern.

Some members of the crew were repatriated on the SS Athenia which was torpedoed on 16 August 1917. Relatives were required to travel to County Donegal to identify the bodies.
