= Kea Channel =

Channel in the Aegean Sea

Coordinates: 37.6829°N 24.2173°E

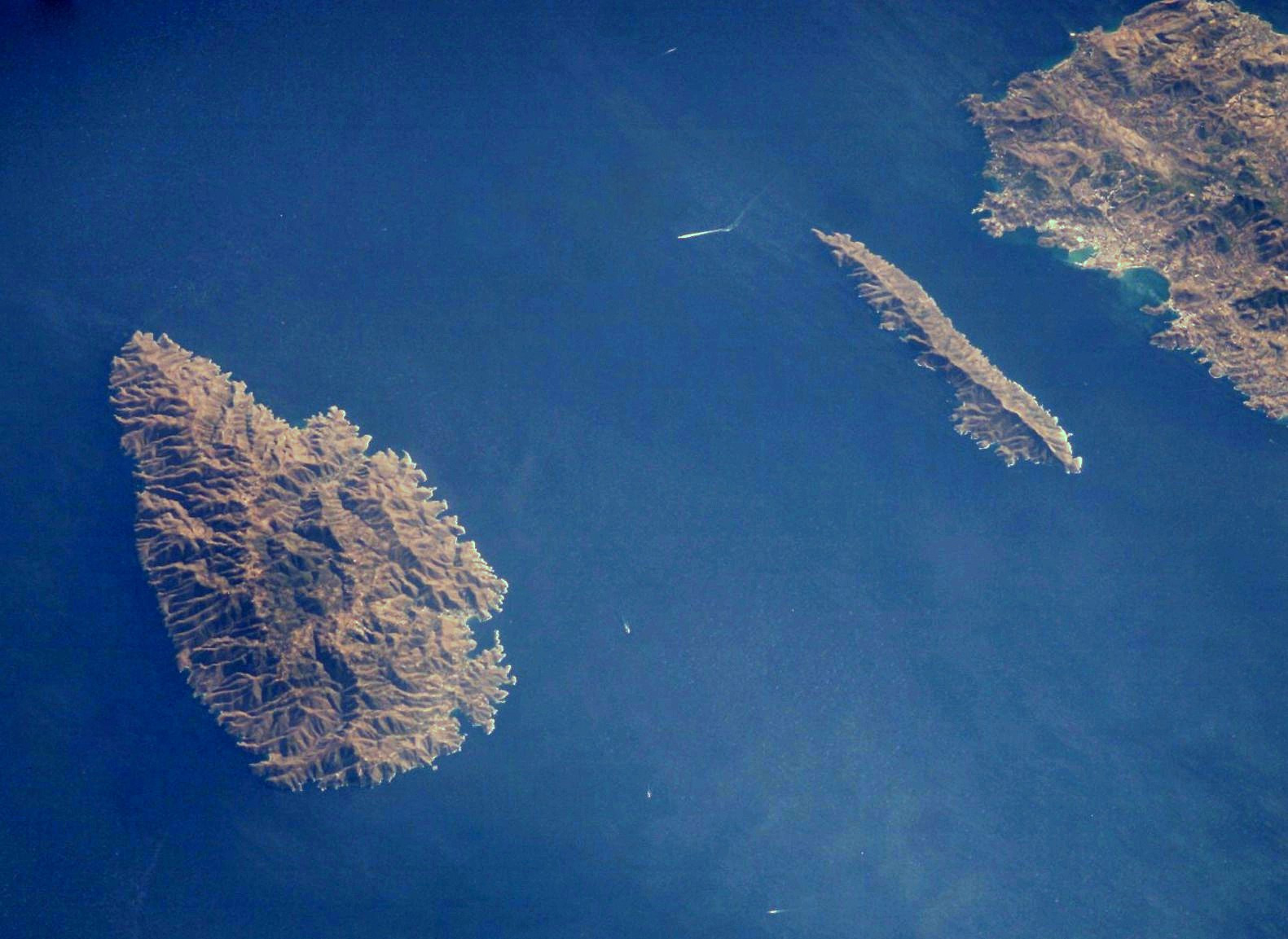
Kea (left) and Makronisos from the International Space Station

The Kea Channel, is a passage of water in the Aegean Sea. The channel lies between the islands of Kea and Makronisos, just off Cape Sounion, Attica on the mainland of Greece.

On 21 November 1916, HMHS Britannic, the third ship of the White Star Line's Olympic-class ocean liners and sister ship of RMS Olympic and RMS Titanic, sank in the channel after hitting a mine, with the loss of thirty lives. She was the largest ship lost during World War I, and until the sinking of SS United States in November 2026, the largest ever intact shipwreck.

A few days prior to Britannic's sinking, on 14 November, the French ship SS Burdigala also sunk in the channel after striking a naval mine, close to Kea Island.
