= HMS Scourge (1910) =

Destroyer of the Royal Navy

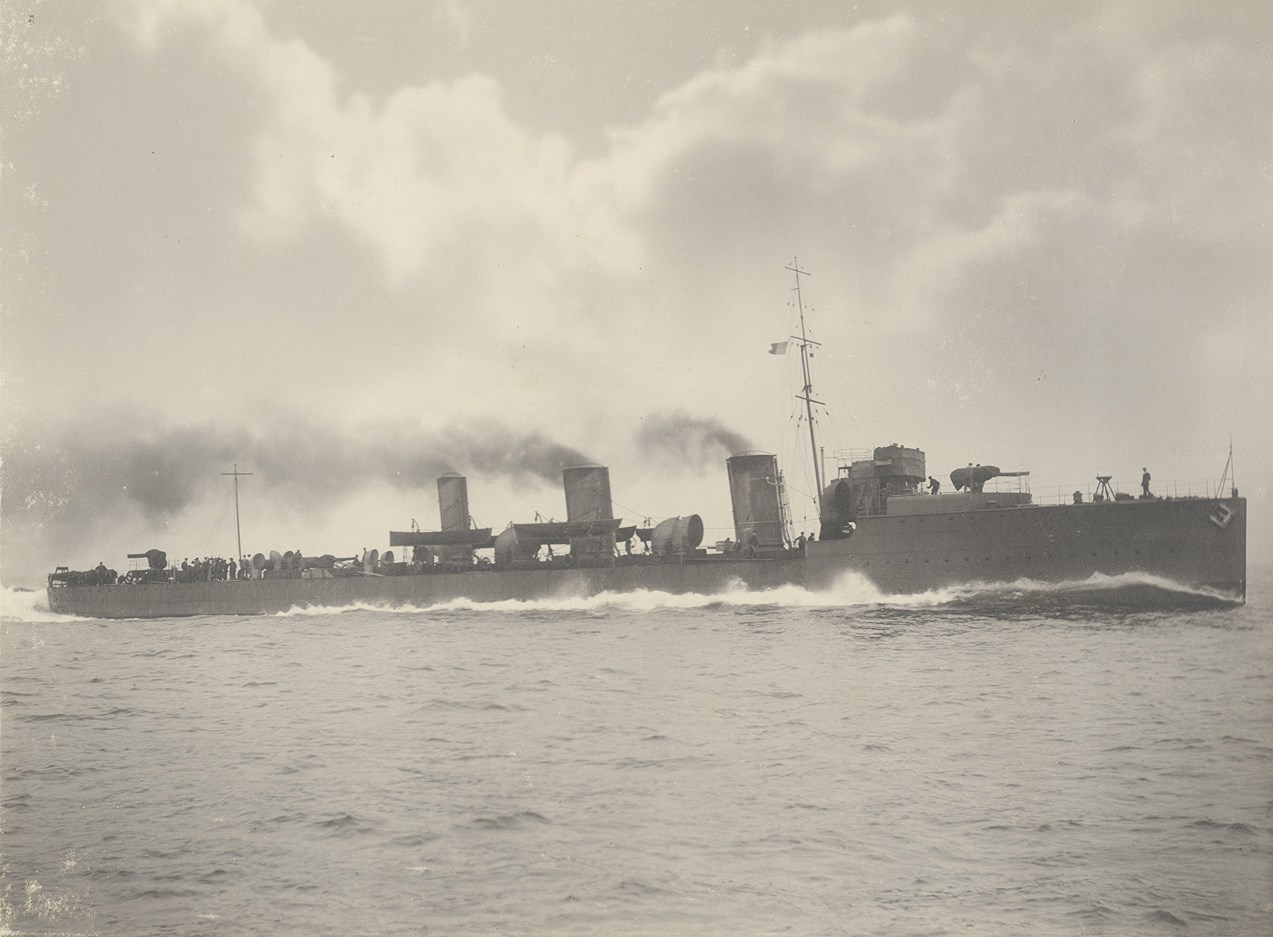
- HMS Scourge at sea 1914

History

United Kingdom
- Name: HMS Scorpion
- Builder: R. W. Hawthorn Leslie & Company
- Launched: 11 February 1910
- Fate: Sold for scrap, 9 May 1921

General characteristics
- Class & type: Beagle-class destroyer
- Displacement: 860–940 long tons (874–955 t)
- Length: 275 ft (84 m)
- Beam: 27 ft 6 in (8.38 m)
- Draught: 8 ft 6 in (2.59 m)
- Installed power: 12,500 hp (9,300 kW)
- Propulsion: Coal-fired boilers, 2 or 3 shaft steam turbines
- Speed: 27 knots (50 km/h; 31 mph)
- Complement: 96
- Armament: 1 × BL 4-inch (100 mm) L/40 Mark VIII guns, mounting P Mark V; 3 × QF 12 pdr 12 cwt Mark I, mounting P Mark I; 2 × single 21 inch (533 mm) torpedo tubes

HMS Scourge was a Beagle-class destroyer, launched in 1910 and served in the Royal Navy. In 1913 she was transferred to the Third Destroyer Flotilla. She was used during the Gallipoli campaign to help transfer regiments to the shore at Anzac Cove and Suvla Bay. Subsequently, she assisted in the rescue of survivors from the sinking of HMHS Britannic.

== Construction and result ==
Scourge was built by the Hawthorn Leslie and Company, and launched on 11 February 1910. She was 84 metres long and 8.4 metres wide. She had three funnels and three propellers, which enabled her to sail at speeds of up to 27 knots (50 km/h; 31 mph).

== Gallipoli landings of WW1 ==
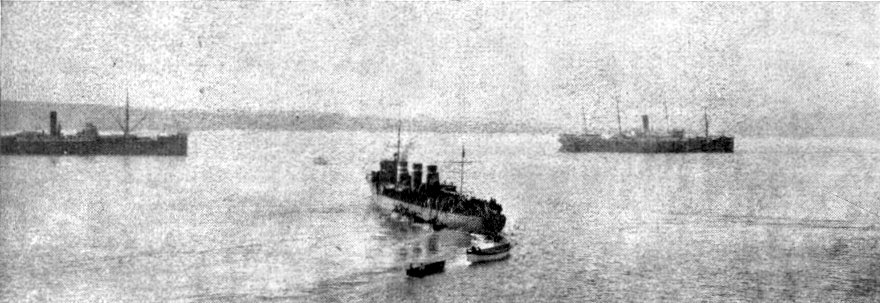
HMS Scourge towing troops to the shore during the landing at Anzac Cove on 25 April 1915

At Suvla Bay on 6–7 August 1915 Scourge worked with five other Beagle destroyers as well as a Portuguese destroyer to tow troop landing craft to the shore.

== Assistance with HMHS Britannic ==
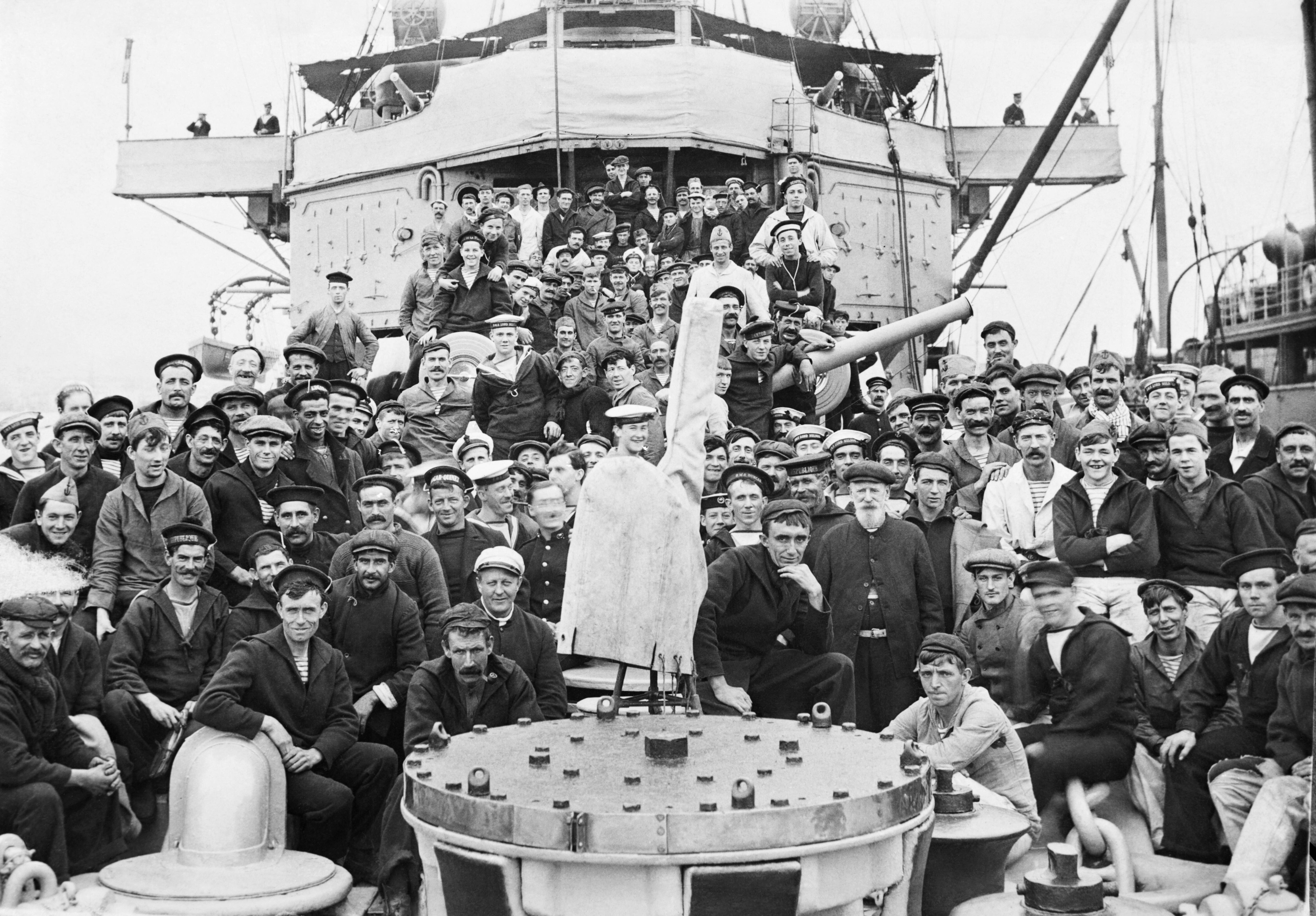
The survivors from HMHS Britannic (including medical personnel and crew members) aboard HMS Scourge

HMS Scourge assisted after the sinking of the hospital ship HMHS Britannic while cruising through the Aegean during the Gallipoli operations. She received SOS and CQD from the Kea Channel; steamed towards the location. Scourge picked up 339 survivors and the rest rowed to land on Kea Island or got picked up by other ships afterwards.

== Fate ==
HMS Scourge was sold on 9 May 1921 and scrapped at Briton Ferry.
