= Ottoman minelayer Intibah =

Ottoman minelayer

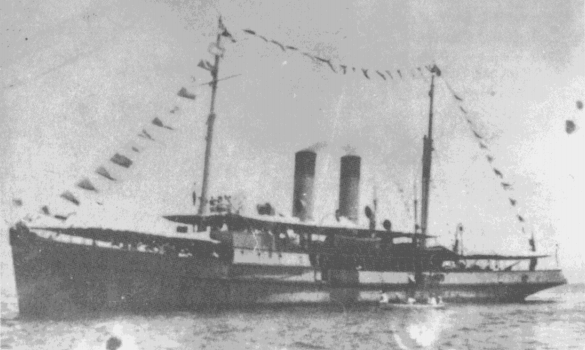
- Intibah, 1914

History

Scotland
- Name: Warren Hastings
- Builder: Robert Duncan and Company, Glasgow
- Yard number: 223
- Laid down: 1886
- Launched: 1886
- Fate: Sold to the Ottoman Empire, 4 March 1912

Ottoman Empire
- Name: Intibah
- Acquired: 4 March 1912
- Reclassified: As a salvage tug, 1912
- Fate: Interned between October 1918 and October 1923
- Notes: Converted to a minelayer at Tersâne-i Âmire, December 1914

Turkey
- Name: Uyanık
- Acquired: October 1923
- Renamed: Intibah, 1933
- Stricken: 1958
- Fate: Sold in 1958 and rebuilt as a cargo boat between 1959-1964; Dismantled, 1999

General characteristics as of 1915
- Class & type: minelayer/tugboat
- Tonnage: 616 grt (1,740 m^{3})
- Length: 61.2 m (200 ft 9 in) (o/a)
- Beam: 9.1 m (29 ft 10 in)
- Draft: 4.7 m (15 ft 5 in)
- Installed power: 1,670 ihp (1,250 kW); 2 x 3-cylinder vertical triple expansion steam engines; 2 boilers
- Speed: 12 knots (22 km/h; 14 mph)
- Range: 2,720 nmi (5,040 km; 3,130 mi) at 19 knots (35 km/h; 22 mph)
- Complement: 12 officers, 46 sailors (1915)
- Armament: 1 × 76 mm Krupp gun; 2 × single QF 47 mm guns; 50 mines

Intibah was a ship used by the Ottoman Navy as a tugboat and minelayer in World War I. Originally a civilian tugboat built in Glasgow in 1886, she was purchased by the Ottoman government in 1912 and converted into a minelayer in 1914.

During the Italo-Turkish War, the Balkan Wars and World War I, she was involved in minelaying, salvage and transport missions, especially with mines in the Dardanelles. After the Armistice of Mudros in October 1918, she was interned in Istanbul with the rest of the fleet. She fled out of Istanbul, brought to Izmit and placed under the command of the Ankara Government before entering the service of the Turkish Navy in October 1923 and being renamed to Uyanık. In 1933–34, she was rearmed in Gölcük and her old name was restored. She was commissioned as a minelayer in İzmir until 1936 and then again in Çanakkale. She was decommissioned from naval service in 1956, towed to Gölcük and sold for civilian use in 1958. Between 1959 and 1964, she was converted into a cargo ship and renamed Ararat M. Okan. At the end of 1997, she was caught while carrying illegal immigrants to Italy, confiscated by the Italian government and sold at auction in November 1998 before being dismantled in Crotone in June 1999.

== Design ==
The Intibah, built in 1886 by Robert Duncan and Company, under the name Warren Hastings in Glasgow, Scotland, at Yard No. 223, was 61.2 metres long, 9.1 metres wide and had a draft of 4.7 metres. Her hull was made of iron. The ship's displacement was 616 tons. The ship was powered by two Rankie & Blackmore-built 3-cylinder triple-expansion steam engines fed by steam from two boilers. The engines had 1,670 indicated horsepower and in 1912 could propel the ship to a speed of 12 knots.

Unarmed until 1912, by 1915 she had a crew of 12 officers and 46 sailors and was armed with a 76 mm QF Krupp gun, two QF 47 mm Armstrong guns and 50 naval mines.

== Operational history ==
=== Ottoman period ===
Built in Glasgow in 1886 as a large salvage tug, she was purchased by the Ottoman government on 4 March 1912 after 26 years of civilian use. She joined the Ottoman Navy as a salvage tug in April 1912, though she was also outfitted for minelaying duties. Intibah was assigned to lay mines in the Dardanelles against Italian ships on 18 April 1912 during the Italo-Turkish War. In the Balkan Wars, during the Battle of Kaliakra, she took part in support missions in the Ottoman fleet. She met the cruiser Hamidiye, which was damaged in the battle on 21–22 November, at the entrance to the Bosphorus on 22 November and towed it to the Golden Horn where it was repaired. On 10 January 1913, she patrolled the mouth of the Dardanelles during the operation against Greek forces in the Aegean Sea. She was fully converted to a minelayer in December 1914 in the Tersâne-i Âmire shipyard on the Golden Horn, she remained in this role during World War I.

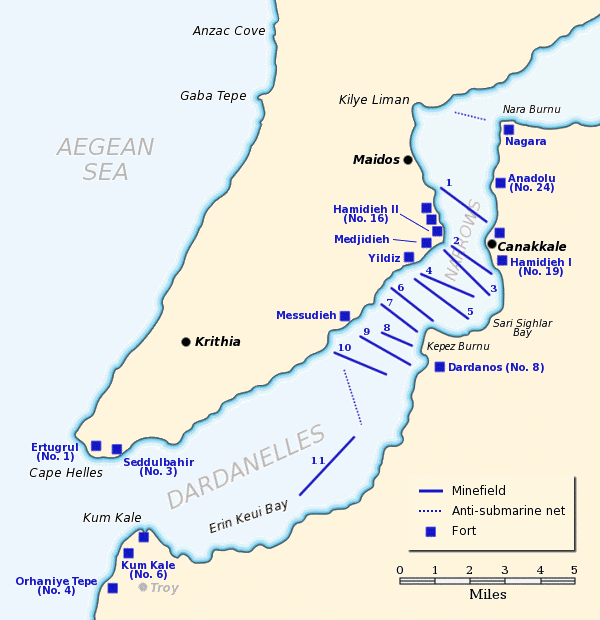
Ottoman defences of the Dardanelles, February–March 1915

Intibah took part in minelaying missions during the Dardanelles Campaign. She sailed to the Dardanelles with mines and parts loaded from Istanbul on 14 August 1914. She laid 40 mines arranged in three separate lines between Soğanlıdere and Kepez Feneri on 15 August 1914 as a defence to intercept British ships. On 6 September, Nusret and Intibah were assigned to protect Mesudiye, which was planned to be used as a floating battery. Mesudiye would later be sunk by the British submarine HMS B11 on 13 December 1914. Intibah laid a fourth row of 29 mines in addition to the three pre-existing minefields on 24 September and a fifth row of 29 mines between the Anatolian and Rumeli bastions on 1 October. She brought the last 25 mines of the reserve depot in Istanbul to Çanakkale on 2 March 1915. At this time the Ottomans were still awaiting the delivery of new mines from Germany. Nusret, which sailed from Nara Burnu at 05:00 on 8 March, laid the last 26 mines in Erenköy Bay as the 11th and final row. The 11 minefields laid by Intibah, Nusret and Selanik during the Allied offensive on 18 March sank the British battleship Ocean and the French battleship Bouvet; the battlecruiser Inflexible also sustained heavy damage from being struck by mines.

The submarine HMS E11 opened fire on Intibah near Şarköy on 7 December 1915, and when she returned fire, the submarine dived away; one officer was killed, and another was wounded in this engagement. Intibah entered the harbour of Palatya and once again engaged in a surface battle with E11 the following day; the submarine was forced to sail away. Two enlisted men from the crew of Intibah were killed in this engagement, and the ship was slightly damaged.

The ship carried a 210 mm German naval gun, which had been purchased for the defence of the Dardanelles and arrived in Istanbul on 1 January 1917, to Çanakkale on 26 January 1917. On 14 July 1917, while carrying coal between Zonguldak and Istanbul, she collided with an underwater object off Anadolu Karaburnu, likely a shipwreck, resulting in severe damage. She was grounded to prevent her from sinking, but was later refloated and towed to Istanbul for extensive repairs.

Intibah took part in the salvage operations of Yavuz Sultan Selim on 20 January 1918, which was damaged by striking a mine during the Battle of Imbros and was beached on a sandbar 200 metres off Nara Burnu in the Dardanelles. During the salvage operation, which took place between 22 and 26 January, the turbulence created by the ship's propellers cleared the sands and Yavuz Sultan Selim was refloated on the morning of 26 January.

=== Republican period ===
The ship was interned with the rest of the Ottoman fleet in Istanbul in October 1918 after the Armistice of Mudros. In late 1922, Intibah, with the steamships Sagram, Saika, Kasım Paşa, Rehber; Haliç, Beykoz, Darıç and the yacht Galata sailed from Istanbul to Izmit. She entered the service of the Republic of Turkey in October 1923 and was renamed Uyanık. Renamed back to Intibah in 1933, she was refitted at Gölcük in 1933–34. Decommissioned from naval service in 1956, she was sold in 1958 and between 1959 and 1964 she was converted into a cargo ship and renamed Ararat M. Okan.

Ararat departed from Turkey on the evening of 21 December 1997 carrying 825 migrants, mostly of Kurdish descent. After briefly stopping off at Greece to resupply on 24 December and Santa Maria di Leuca on 26 December, the ship ran aground off Santa Caterina dello Ionio later that day and was seized by the Italian authorities the following day. Passengers of the ship reported overcrowded conditions and being fed nothing but bread and cheese. She was sold at auction in November 1998 and eventually dismantled in Crotone in June 1999.
