= HMS Vengeance (1899) =

Pre-dreadnought battleship of the British Royal Navy

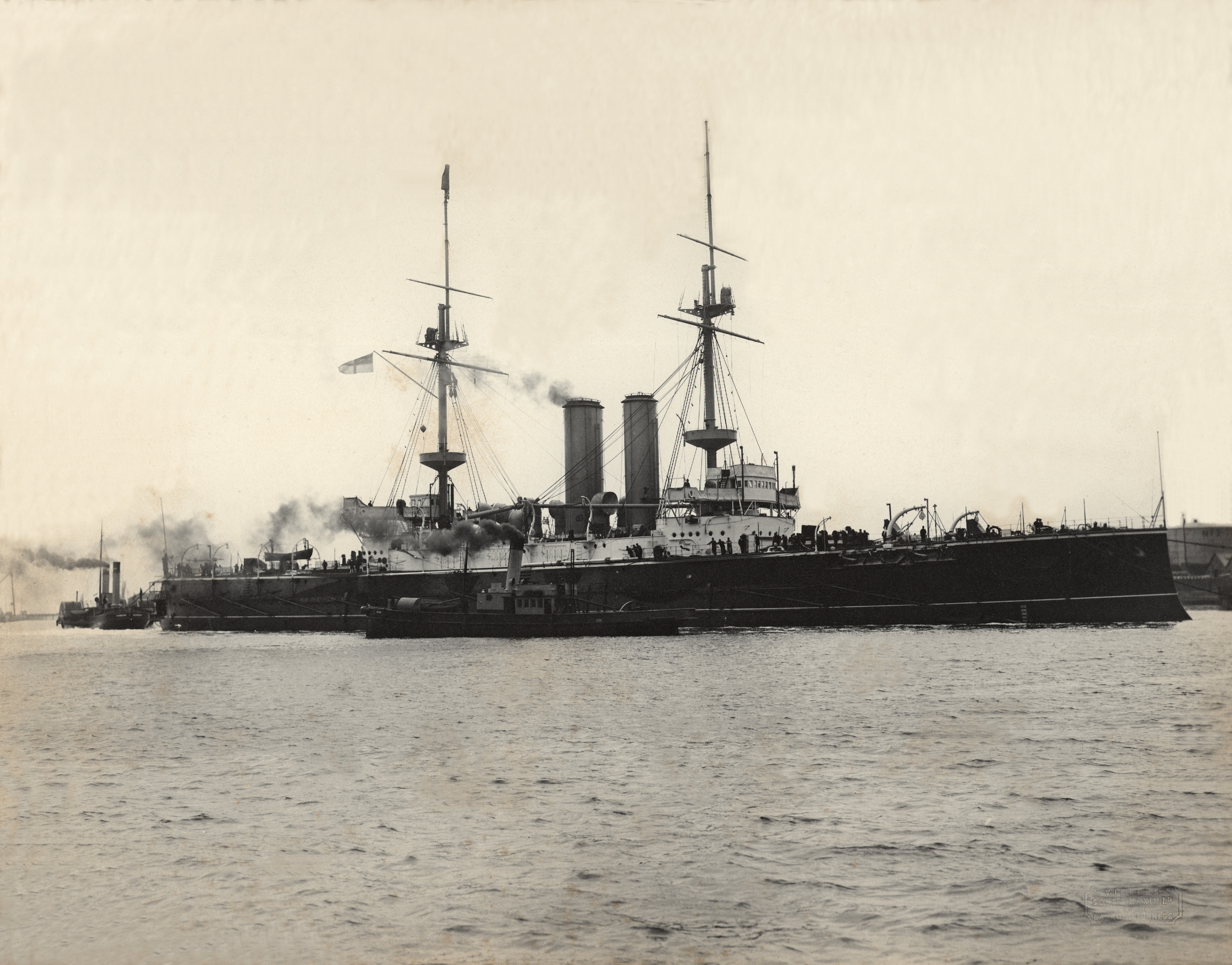
- HMS Vengeance in harbour, prior to the Royal Navy's 1903 adoption of the overall grey warship colour scheme.

History

United Kingdom
- Name: HMS Vengeance
- Ordered: 1897 Programme
- Builder: Vickers, Barrow-in-Furness
- Laid down: 23 August 1898
- Launched: 25 July 1899
- Completed: April 1902
- Commissioned: 8 April 1902
- Decommissioned: 9 July 1920
- Fate: Sold for scrapping 1 December 1921

General characteristics
- Class & type: Canopus-class pre-dreadnought battleship
- Displacement: Full load: 14,300 long tons (14,500 t)
- Length: 421 ft 6 in (128.5 m) (loa)
- Beam: 74 ft (22.6 m)
- Draught: 26 ft (7.9 m)
- Installed power: 20 × water tube boilers; 13,500 ihp (10,100 kW)
- Propulsion: 2 × screw propellers; 2 × triple-expansion steam engines
- Speed: 18 knots (33 km/h)
- Complement: 682
- Armament: 4 × BL 12 in (305 mm) 35-caliber Mk VIII guns; 12 × QF 6 in (152 mm) 40-caliber guns; 10 × 12-pounder 76 mm (3 in) quick-firing guns; 6 × 3-pounder guns; 4 × 18 in (457 mm) torpedo tubes
- Armour: Belt: 6 in; Bulkheads: 6–10 in (152–254 mm); Barbettes: 12 in; Gun turrets: 8 in (203 mm); Casemates: 5 in (127 mm); Conning tower: 12 in; Deck: 1–2 in (25–51 mm)

HMS Vengeance was a pre-dreadnought battleship of the British Royal Navy and a member of the Canopus class. Intended for service in Asia, Vengeance and her sister ships were smaller and faster than the preceding Majestic-class battleships, but retained the same battery of four 12-inch (305 mm) guns. She also carried thinner armour, but incorporated new Krupp steel, which was more effective than the Harvey armour used in the Majestics. Vengeance was laid down in August 1898, launched in July 1899, and commissioned into the fleet in April 1902.

On entering service, Vengeance was assigned to the China Station, but the Anglo-Japanese Alliance rendered her presence there unnecessary, and she returned to European waters in 1905. Late that year, she underwent a refit that lasted into 1906. She then served in the Channel Fleet until 1908, when she moved to the Home Fleet, thereafter serving in secondary roles, including as a tender and a gunnery training ship. In 1913, she was transferred to the 6th Battle Squadron of the Second Fleet.

Following Britain's entrance into the First World War in August 1914, Vengeance patrolled the English Channel with the 8th Battle Squadron before moving to Alexandria to protect the Suez Canal in November 1914. She then joined the Dardanelles Campaign in January 1915, where she saw extensive action trying to force the Dardanelles strait in February and March and later supporting the fighting ashore during the Gallipoli Campaign in April and May. Worn out from these operations, she returned to Britain for a refit. She was recommissioned in December 1915 for service in East Africa, during which she supported the capture of Dar es Salaam in German East Africa. She returned to Britain again in 1917 and was decommissioned, thereafter serving in subsidiary roles until 1921, when she was sold for scrap. Vengeance was broken up the following year.

== Design ==
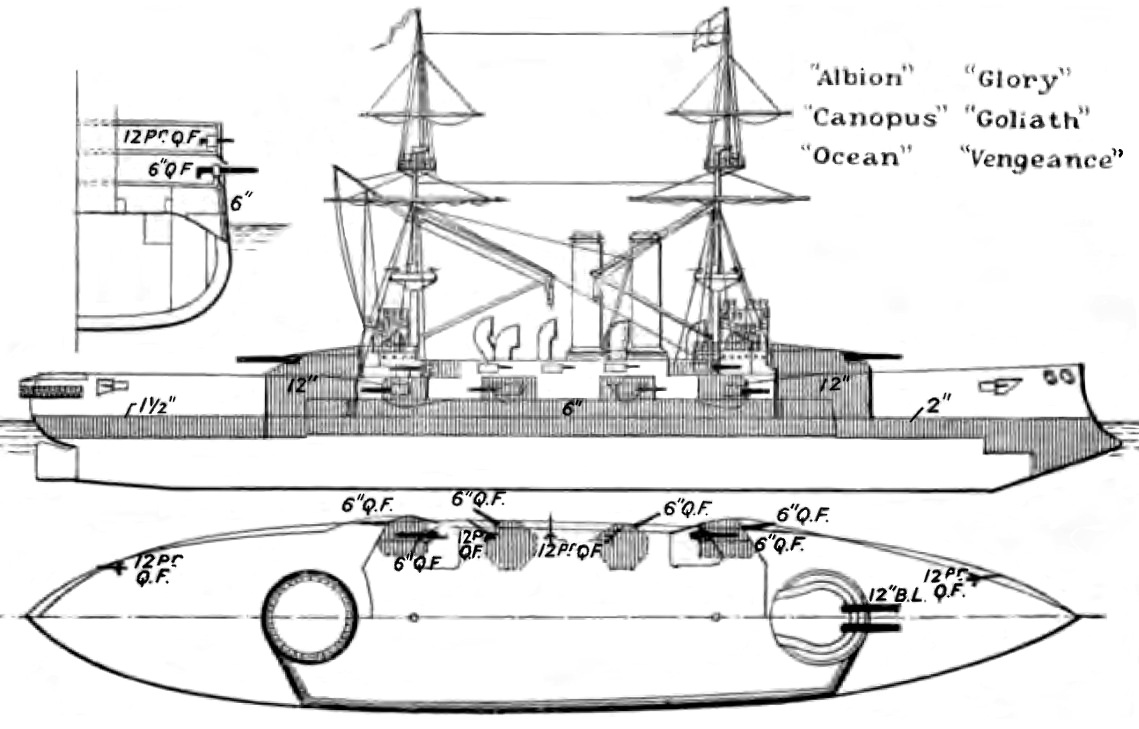
Right elevation, deck plan and hull section as depicted in Brassey's Naval Annual 1906

Vengeance and her five sister ships were designed for service in East Asia, where the new rising power Japan was beginning to build a powerful navy, though this role was quickly made redundant by the Anglo-Japanese Alliance of 1902. The ships were designed to be smaller, lighter and faster than their predecessors, the Majestic-class battleships. Vengeance was 421 feet 6 inches (128.47 m) long overall, with a beam of 74 ft (23 m) and a draught of 26 ft 2 in (7.98 m). She displaced 13,150 long tons (13,360 t) normally and up to 14,300 long tons (14,500 t) fully loaded. Her crew numbered 682 officers and ratings.

The Canopus-class ships were powered by a pair of 3-cylinder triple-expansion engines, with steam provided by twenty Belleville boilers. They were the first British battleships with water-tube boilers, which generated more power at less expense in weight compared with the fire-tube boilers used in previous ships. The new boilers led to the adoption of fore-and-aft funnels, rather than the side-by-side funnel arrangement used in many previous British battleships. The Canopus-class ships proved to be good steamers, with a high speed for battleships of their time—18 knots (33 km/h; 21 mph) from 13,500 indicated horsepower (10,100 kW)—a full two knots faster than the Majestics.

Vengeance had a main battery of four BL 12 in (305 mm) 35-caliber Mk VIII guns mounted in twin-gun turrets fore and aft; these guns were mounted in circular barbettes that allowed all-around loading, although at a fixed elevation. The ships also mounted a secondary battery of twelve 6-inch (152 mm) 40-calibre guns mounted in casemates, in addition to ten 12-pounder guns and six 3-pounder guns for defence against torpedo boats. As was customary for battleships of the period, she was also equipped with four 18-inch (457 mm) torpedo tubes submerged in the hull, two on each broadside near the forward and aft barbette.

To save weight, Vengeance carried less armour than the Majestics—6 inches (152 mm) in the belt compared to 9 in (229 mm)—although the change from Harvey armour in the Majestics to Krupp armour in Vengeance meant that the loss in protection was not as great as it might have been, Krupp armour having greater protective value at a given thickness than its Harvey equivalent. Similarly, the other armour used to protect the ship could also be thinner; the bulkheads on either end of the belt were 6 to 10 in (152 to 254 mm) thick. The main battery turrets were 8 in thick, atop 12 in (305 mm) barbettes, and the casemate battery was protected with 5 in (127 mm) of Krupp steel. Her conning tower had 12 in thick sides as well. She was fitted with two armoured decks, 1 and 2 in (25 and 51 mm) thick, respectively.

== Service history ==
=== Pre-First World War ===
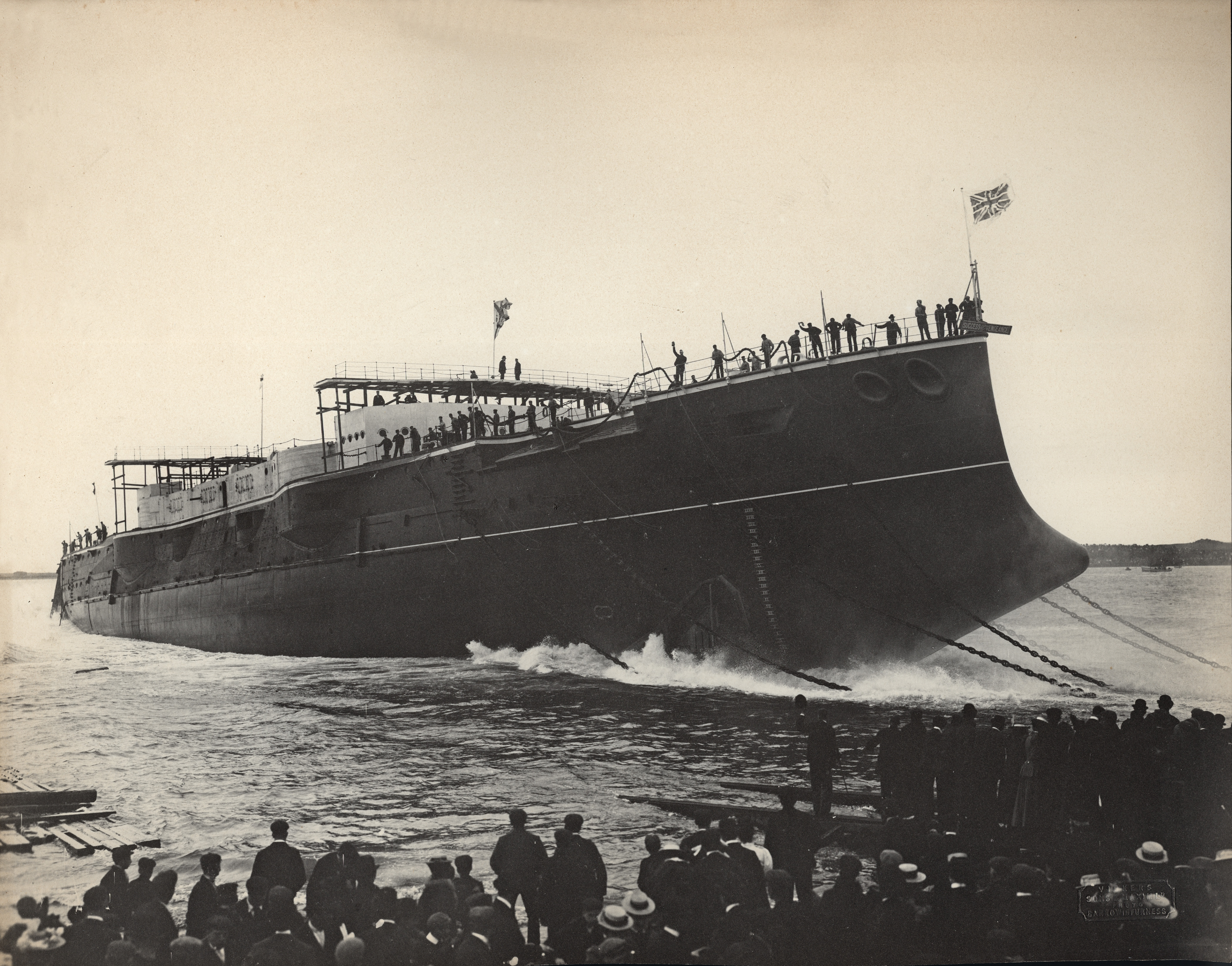
Launch of HMS Vengeance (1899)

HMS Vengeance was laid down by Vickers at Barrow-in-Furness on 23 August 1898 and launched on 25 July 1899. Her completion was delayed by damage to the fitting-out dock, and she was not completed until April 1902. She was the first British battleship completely built, armed, and engined by a single company. HMS Vengeance was commissioned at Portsmouth by Captain Leslie Creery Stuart on 8 April 1902 for service with the Mediterranean Fleet. She left the United Kingdom early the following month, arriving at Malta on 12 May. In September 1902 she visited the Aegean Sea with other ships of the station for combined manoeuvres near Nauplia, and two months later she was back visiting Plataea. In July 1903 she transferred to the China Station to relieve her sister ship Goliath, and underwent a refit at Hong Kong in 1903–1904.

In 1905, the United Kingdom and Japan ratified a treaty of alliance, reducing the need for a large Royal Navy presence on the China Station and prompting a recall of all battleships from the station. Vengeance was recalled on 1 June 1905 and proceeded to Singapore, where she and her sister ship Albion rendezvoused with their sister Ocean and the battleship Centurion. The four battleships departed Singapore on 20 June 1905 and steamed home in company, arriving at Plymouth on 2 August 1905. Vengeance paid off into the Devonport Reserve on 23 August 1905, and underwent a refit that lasted into 1906 during which her machinery was repaired.

On 15 May 1906, Vengeance commissioned for service in the Channel Fleet. She transferred to the Home Fleet on 6 May 1908, and on 13 June 1908 was damaged in a collision with the merchant ship SS Begore Head at Portsmouth. She moved to the Nore Division, Home Fleet, at the Nore in February 1909, where she became a parent ship to special service vessels, and grounded in the Thames Estuary on 28 February 1909 without damage. In April 1909, she became tender to the Chatham Dockyard gunnery school, where she acted as a gunnery drill ship. On 29 November 1910, Vengeance suffered another mishap when she collided in fog with the merchant ship SS Biter, suffering damage to her side, net shelf, and net booms. Vengeance then served in the 6th Battle Squadron based at Portland, then became a gunnery training ship at the Nore in January 1913.The 6th Squadron, together with the 5th Battle Squadron, formed the core of the Second Fleet.

=== First World War ===
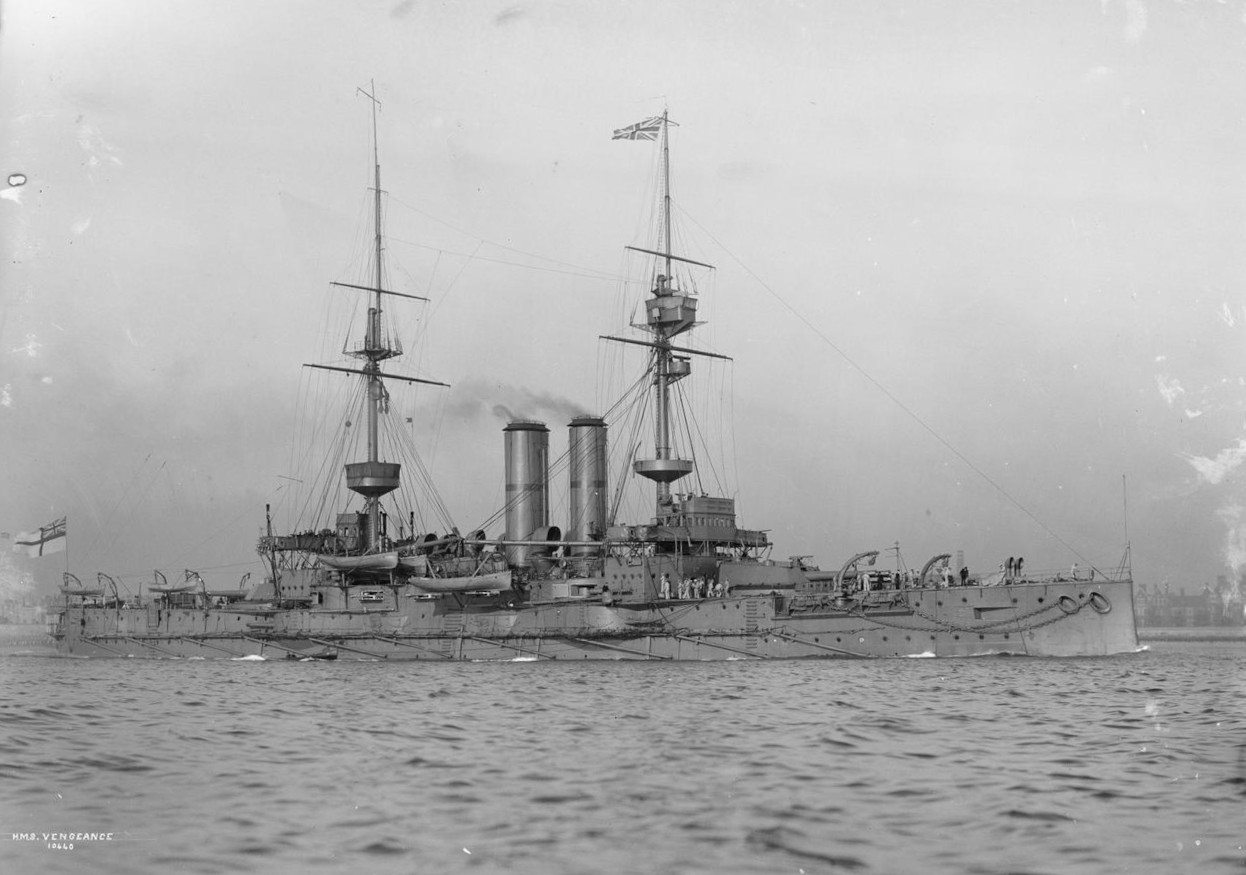
Vengeance in 1908

On the outbreak of the First World War in August 1914, the Royal Navy mobilised to meet the German High Seas Fleet. On 7 August, the 6th Battle Squadron was dissolved, the more modern Duncan-class battleships being transferred to the Grand Fleet; Vengeance was assigned to the 8th Battle Squadron, Channel Fleet. The 8th Squadron was tasked with patrol duties in the English Channel and Atlantic, though Vengeance was quickly transferred to the 7th Battle Squadron on 15 August 1914 to relieve the battleship Prince George as the squadron flagship. Shortly thereafter, half of the 7th Squadron battleships were dispersed to strengthen the detached cruiser squadrons patrolling for German commerce raiders, leaving only Vengeance, Prince George, Caesar, and Goliath and the protected cruiser Proserpine. She covered the landing of the Plymouth Marine Battalion at Ostend, Belgium, on 25 August 1914. For this operation, she and the other five ships of the squadron, along with six destroyers, escorted the troopships; at the same time, elements of the Grand Fleet attacked the German patrol line off Heligoland to occupy the High Seas Fleet.

In November 1914, she was transferred to Alexandria to replace a pair of older French vessels, the battleship Bouvet and the armoured cruiser Amiral Charner that had in turn relieved the armoured cruisers Black Prince and Warrior as guard ships for the Suez Canal. She later moved on to the Cape Verde-Canary Islands Station to relieve Albion as guard ship at Saint Vincent.

==== Dardanelles campaign ====
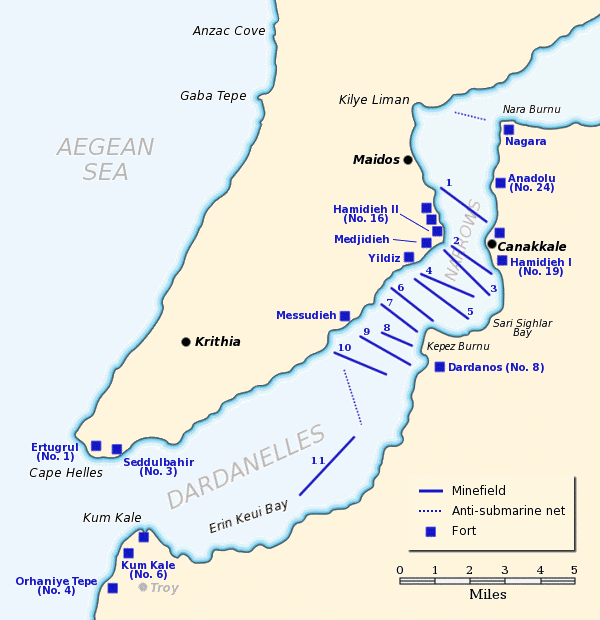
Map showing the Ottoman defences at the Dardanelles in 1915

On 22 January 1915, Vengeance was selected to take part in the Dardanelles campaign. She stopped at Gibraltar that month to embark Admiral John de Robeck and become second flagship of the Dardanelles squadron, and arrived at the Dardanelles in February 1915. Admiral Sackville Carden, the commander of the British Mediterranean Fleet, devised a plan to force the straits and attack the Ottoman capital by neutralising the Ottoman coastal defences at long range, clearing the minefields in the Dardanelles, and then entering the Sea of Marmara.

Vengeance participated in the opening bombardment of the Ottoman Turkish entrance forts on 18 February and 19 February 1915, though her role as de Robeck's flagship limited her to observing the fire of the other ships in his formation. The battleship Cornwallis developed problems with her capstan and so could not anchor in her firing position, forcing Vengeance to take her place. She bombarded the Orkanie fortress with direct fire, but aerial reconnaissance proved that the fortress guns had not been disabled. Nevertheless, Carden ordered Vengeance and several other battleships to close with their targets and engage them at close range. The French battleship Suffren joined Vengeance in shelling Orkanie. Later in the afternoon, both ships began to engage a battery at Kumkale with their main guns, while their secondary battery kept firing at Orkanie. At 16:10, Carden ordered them to cease fire and inspect the fortification. On closing, Vengeance came under heavy fire from Orkanie and a battery at Cape Helles. Contre-amiral (Rear Admiral) Émile Guépratte, the commander of the French contingent, later wrote that "the daring attack of the Vengeance in flinging herself against the forts when their fire was in no way reduced was one of the finest episodes of the day." She suffered some damage to her masts and rigging from gunfire from the forts, but she was not hit directly. Several other battleships came to her aid, and at 17:20, Carden ordered a retreat.

On 25 February, Vengeance took part in another attack on the Dardanelles fortresses. Along with Cornwallis and the French battleships Suffren and Charlemagne, she led the assault, which was supported by one French and three British battleships. Once the four supporting battleships had taken up their positions and begun firing at long range to suppress the Ottoman batteries, Vengeance and Cornwallis made the first pass at close range, intending to destroy the guns with direct hits. De Robeck took Vengeance to within 4,000 yards (3,700 m) of the fortifications at Kumkale and fired for ten minutes, before turning about to allow Cornwallis to engage the guns. The two French ships then followed, and by 15:00, the Ottoman guns had been effectively silenced, allowing for minesweepers to advance and attempt to clear the minefields; most of the fleet withdrew while the minesweepers worked, though Vengeance and the battleships Albion and Triumph remained behind to cover them. By clearing these fields, Allied warships could now enter the Dardanelles themselves, opening the route to attack additional fortifications around the town of Dardanus. While other vessels shelled the forts there, Vengeance and the battleship Irresistible sent men ashore to destroy an abandoned artillery battery near Kumkale, with both ships remaining off shore to support the raid. The men landed unopposed, but the detachment from Vengeance quickly came under fire from Ottoman infantry on the far side of Kumkale. Lieutenant-Commander Eric Gascoigne Robinson, who led Vengeance's demolition party, went forward by himself to destroy an Ottoman anti-aircraft gun, then led his detachment to destroy a second anti-aircraft gun and the one remaining gun at the Orkanie battery. For his actions, he was awarded the Victoria Cross. Ottoman resistance prevented any further action, and the men returned to Vengeance.

By late February, Vengeance was in need of boiler maintenance, so de Robeck transferred his flag to Irresistible while Vengeance went to Mudros for repairs. She had returned by 6 March, in time for another bombardment of the Ottoman defences; de Robeck again transferred his flag back to the ship for the operation. This time, the plan involved using Albion to spot for the powerful dreadnought battleship Queen Elizabeth, which was to fire indirectly in the hopes of being able to neutralise the Ottoman guns at a range at which they could not respond. Vengeance and three other battleships covered Albion inside the straits. The ships quickly silenced the Ottoman guns at Dardanus, but mobile artillery batteries continually forced both Albion and Queen Elizabeth to shift position, largely preventing the latter from firing and the former from relaying corrections for the few shots Queen Elizabeth had been able to make. Nightfall and the lack of progress led to the operation being called off. Two days later, Queen Elizabeth was sent into the straits in an attempt to destroy the guns with direct fire, while Vengeance and three other battleships covered her from the mobile howitzers. Poor visibility hampered Queen Elizabeth's gunners, and at 15:30 Carden called off the attack, having achieved nothing.

Vengeance also took part in the main attack on the Narrows forts on 18 March 1915, by which time Carden had fallen ill and had to resign, leaving de Robeck to take overall command of the fleet. He therefore shifted his flag to Queen Elizabeth, and Vengeance returned to the Second Division as a private ship. Vengeance did not engage the Ottomans until later in the afternoon, after Bouvet had been mined and sunk. Vengeance attacked the Ottoman "Hamidieh" battery, but most of her shells fell harmlessly in the center of the fortification, away from the guns. When it became clear that the Ottoman fortresses could not be silenced in time to allow the minesweepers to begin clearing the minefields further in the straits, de Robeck ordered the fleet to withdraw. In the process, two British battleships were also mined and sunk, and the battlecruiser Inflexible had also struck a mine, though she managed to return to Malta for repairs.

By late-April, the First Squadron included Vengeance, seven other battleships, and four cruisers, and was commanded by Rear Admiral Rosslyn Wemyss. The First Squadron was tasked with supporting the Landing at Cape Helles, which took place on 25 April. Vengeance and the battleship Lord Nelson were initially assigned to support the landing at Morto Bay, taking up their firing positions at 05:00 and opening fire at Ottoman positions in the heights around the bay shortly thereafter. Lord Nelson was later sent to support other landing beaches further south on the peninsula, and Vengeance was joined by Prince George. As the allied ground forces advanced on Krithia, Vengeance and several other battleships provided fire support, though the Ottomans blocked the attack in the First Battle of Krithia.

Through early May, she remained off the beachhead, supporting the allied right flank along with Lord Nelson and the French battleship Jauréguiberry. She supported the ground troops during the Ottoman attack on Allied positions at Anzac Cove on 19 May 1915, before retiring to Mudros to replenish her fuel and ammunition. She returned to Gallipoli on 25 May to relieve her sister Canopus. A submarine attacked her that day while she was steaming up from Mudros, but Vengeance quickly turned to starboard to avoid the torpedo and fired several shots at the submarine's periscope, forcing her to withdraw. By July 1915, Vengeance had boiler defects that prevented her from continuing combat operations, and she returned to the United Kingdom and paid off that month. She was under refit at Devonport until December 1915.

==== Later service ====
Vengeance recommissioned in December 1915 and left Devonport on 30 December 1915 for a deployment to East Africa. The Royal Navy had begun sending reinforcements to the area in November to support the East African Campaign; on her arrival there, she joined three monitors, two cruisers, two armed merchant vessels, and two gunboats. While there, she supported operations leading to the capture of Dar es Salaam in 1916. In February 1917, Vengeance returned to the United Kingdom and paid off. She was laid up until February 1918, when she recommissioned for use in experiments with anti-flash equipment for the fleet's guns. She completed these in April 1918, and then was partially disarmed, with four 6-inch (152-mm) main-deck casemate guns removed and four 6-inch guns being installed in open shields on the battery deck. She became an ammunition store ship in May 1918. Vengeance was placed on the sale list at Devonport on 9 July 1920, and was sold for scrapping on 1 December 1921. She had an eventful trip to the scrapyard. After she departed Devonport under tow on 27 December 1921 en route to Dover, her tow rope parted in the English Channel on 29 December 1921. French tugs located her and towed her to Cherbourg, France. From there she was towed to Dover, where she finally arrived for scrapping on 9 January 1922.
