= Gulf of Erenköy =

Gulf of Erenköy is a gulf in the Dardanelles strait, Turkey. It is named after the town of Erenköy. At 40°01′N 26°17′E it is situated at the south east side of the strait. At this point the width of the strait is 7,500 metres (24,600 ft) The midpoint of the gulf is known as Karanlık Liman ("Dark Harbor") Administratively is a part of Çanakkale Province.

== The gulf in the World War I ==
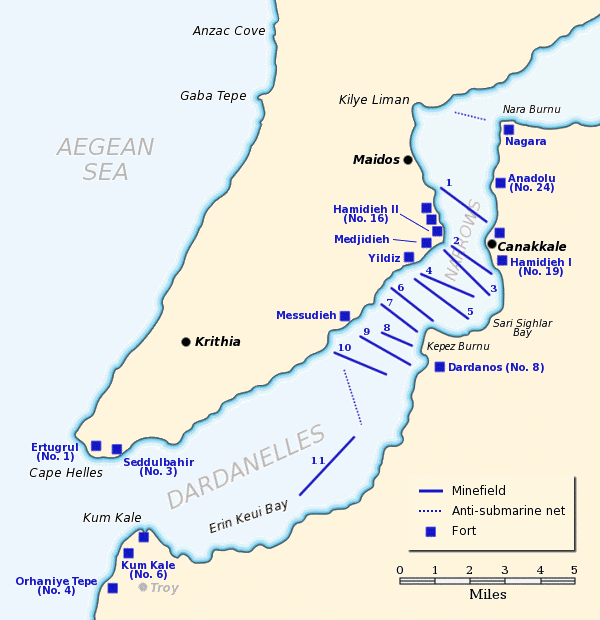
Layout of naval mine line, numbered 11, laid in the Gulf of Erenköy (Erin Keui Bay) by the minelayer Nusret on 8 March 1915.

During the initial naval operations carried on by the Allies of World War I in 1914 November and 1915 February, Ottoman defenders observed that the Allied ships used the gulf of Erenköy as a maneuvering space. When a ship was returning she was using the gulf to veer, in order not to block the other ships following her.

Before the main naval assault on 18 March 1915, the Ottoman minelayer Nusret, under the command of Captain Hakkı and Captain Nazmi, was tasked to lay naval mines in the gulf. The strait was already mined as this was expected by the Allies. Additionally, 26 mines were laid in the Gulf of Erenköy parallel to the coast line unobserved by the Allies. The Turkish military became aware of the practice of the Allies battleships making a turn-back manoeuvre in the gulf when they face heavy artillery fire.

On 18 March 1915, during the main assault of the Allies, four Allies battleships, French battleship Bouvet, HMS Irresistible (1898), HMS Ocean (1898) and HMS Inflexible (1907) were struck by the mines in the gulf. Among these, both Bouvet and Irresistible were already hit by the artillery in Turkish redoubt before striking the mine.

== See also ==
- Erenköy, Çanakkale

== Gallery ==
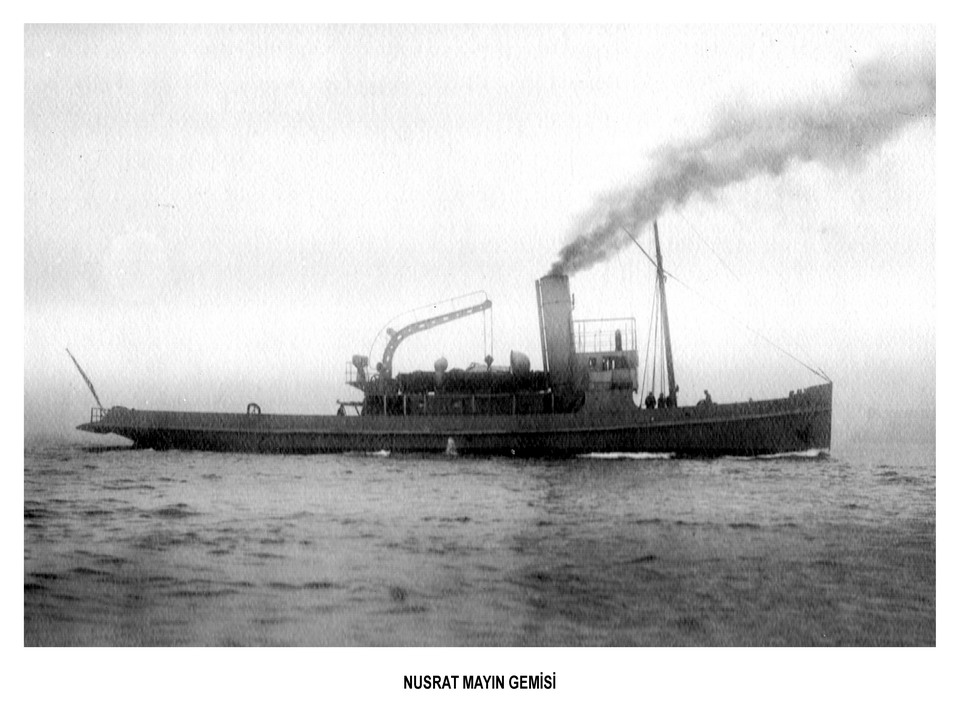
Ottoman minelayer Nusret

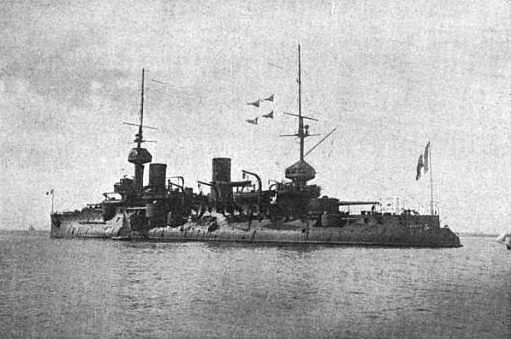
French battleship Bouvet, immediately sank.

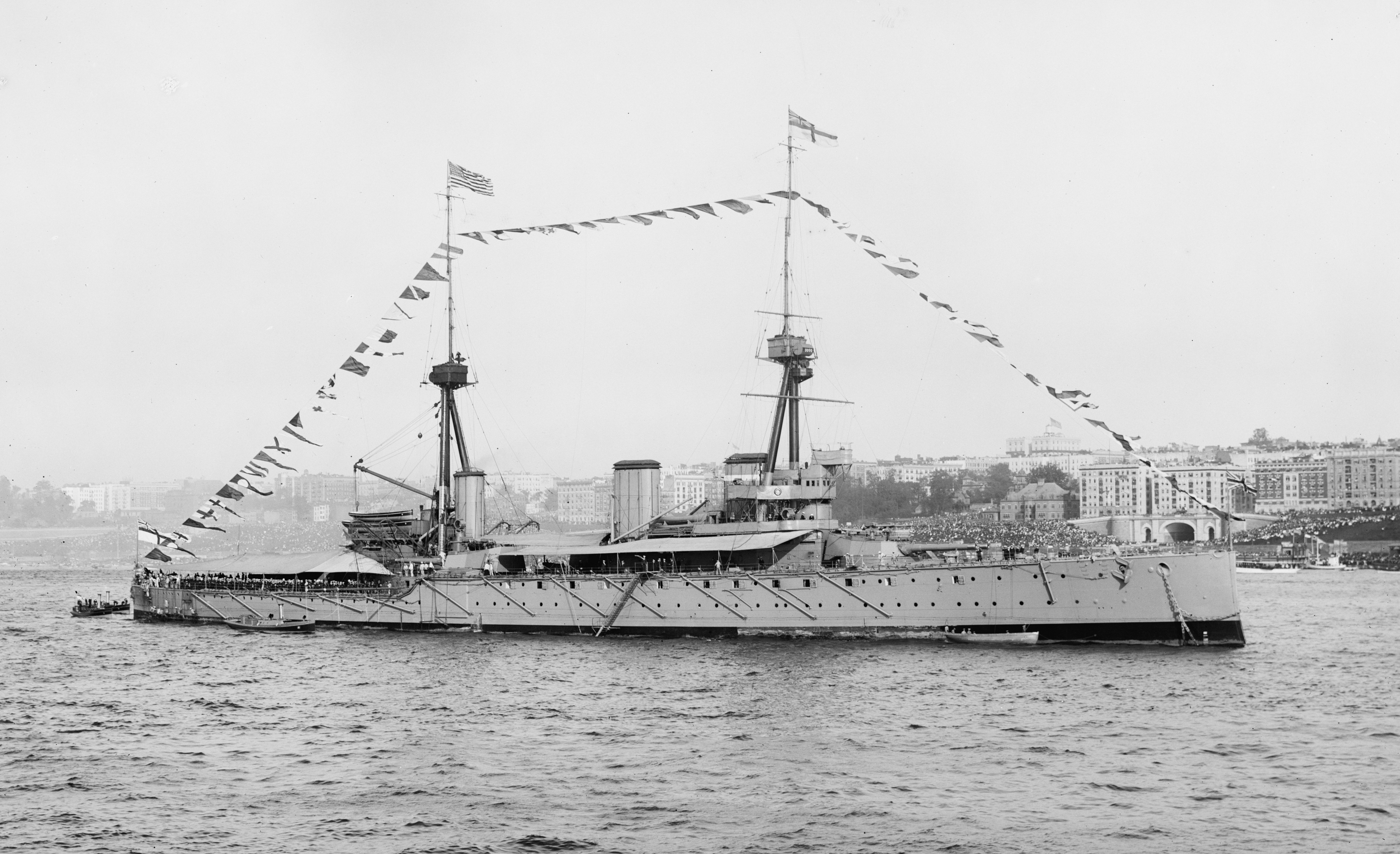
HMS Inflexible (1907), survived after maintenance.

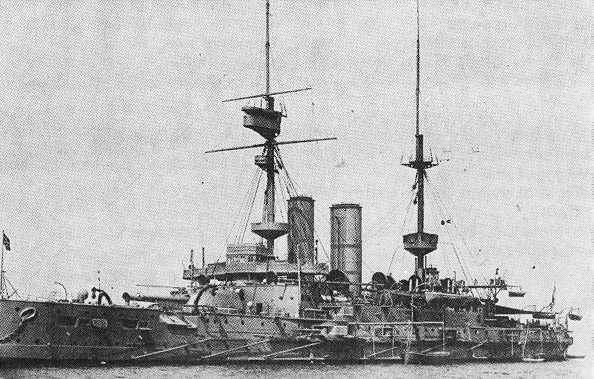
HMS Irresistible (1898), drifted and sank in the Bay of Morto.

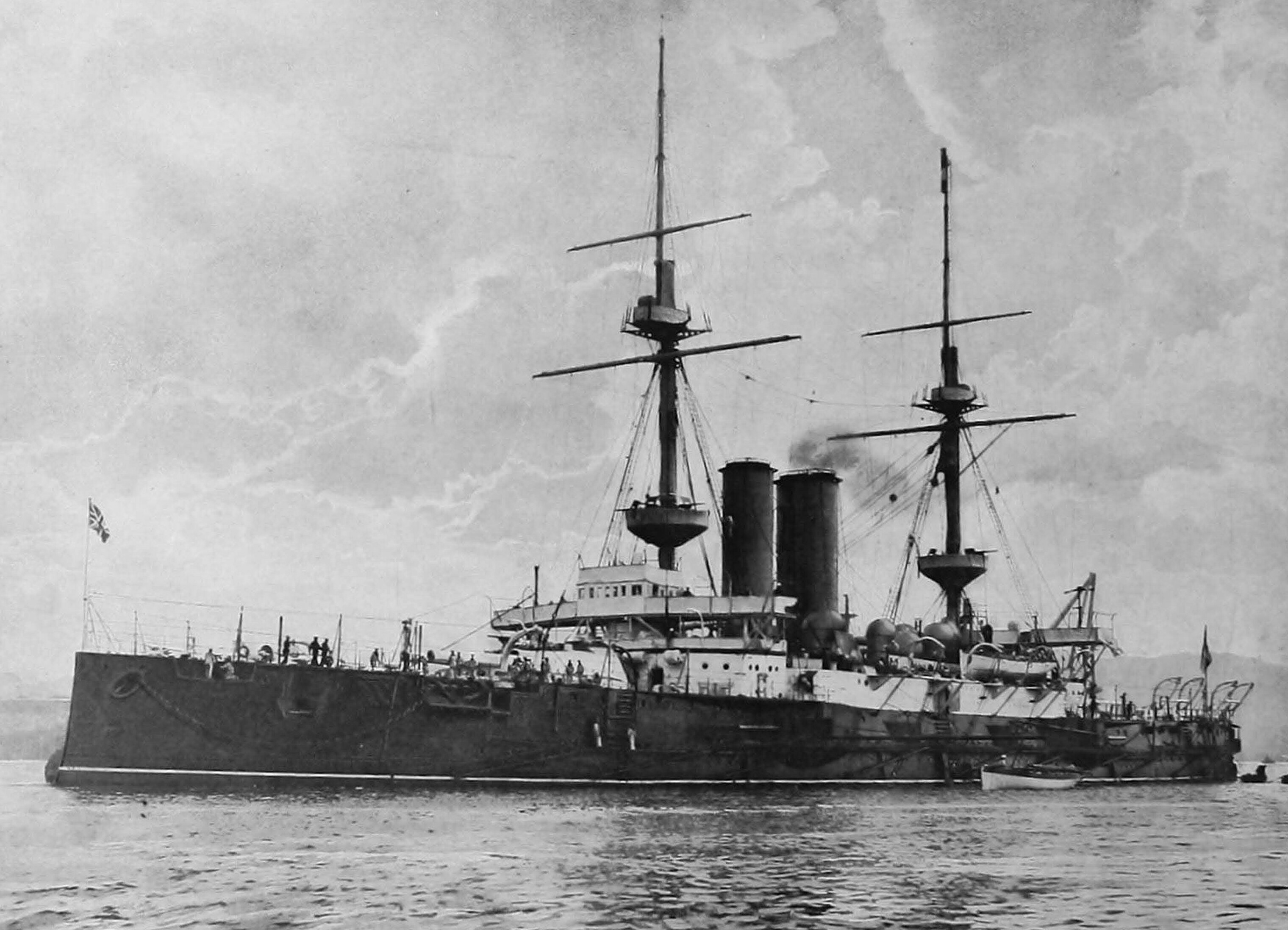
HMS Ocean (1898)}, drifted and sank in the Bay of Morto.
