= HMS Goliath (1898) =

Pre-dreadnought battleship of the British Royal Navy

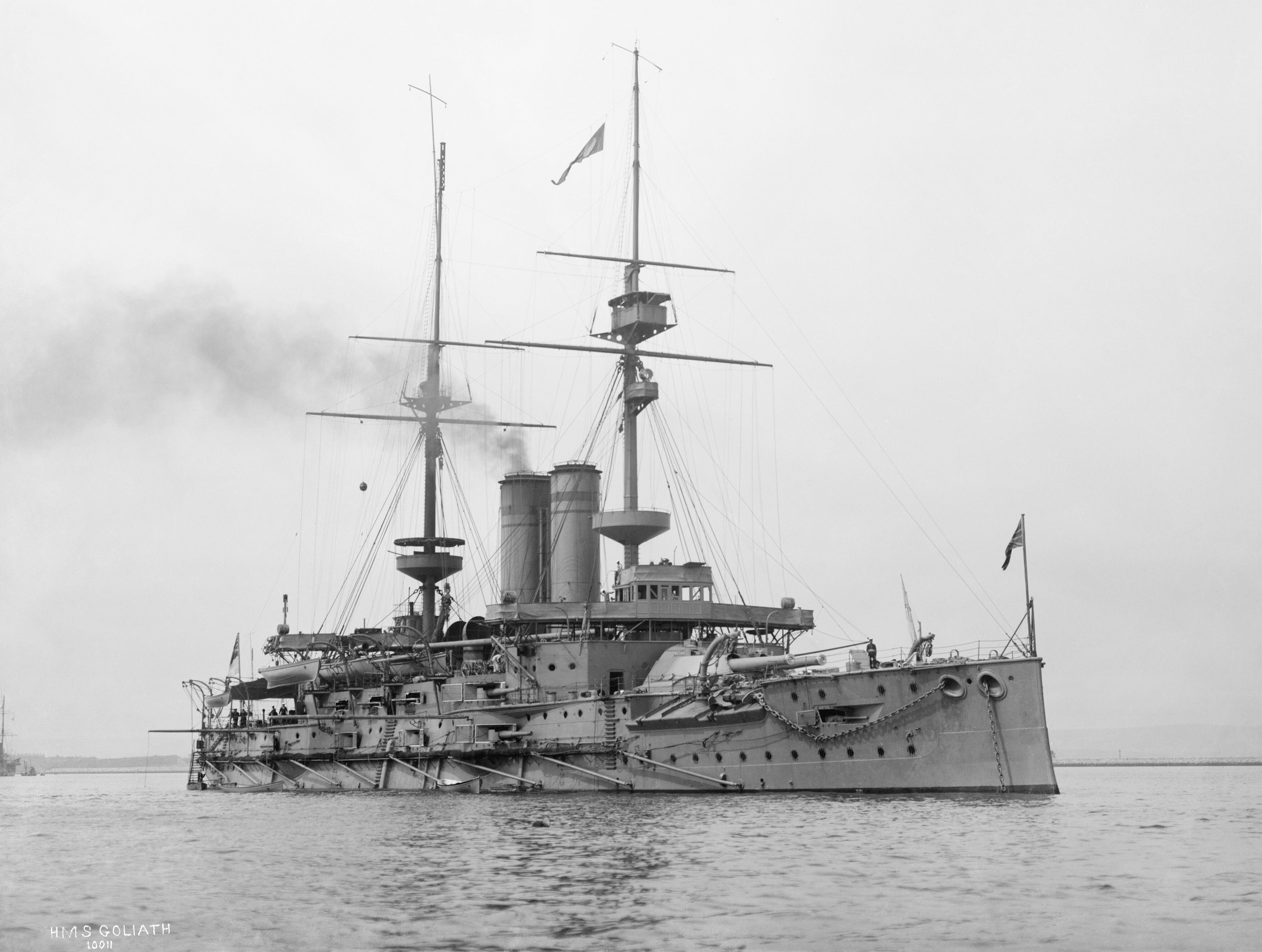
- HMS Goliath

History

United Kingdom
- Name: HMS Goliath
- Namesake: Goliath
- Builder: Chatham Dockyard
- Cost: £920,806
- Laid down: 4 January 1897
- Launched: 23 March 1898
- Commissioned: 27 March 1900
- Nickname(s): Golly
- Fate: Torpedoed and sunk, 13 May 1915

General characteristics
- Class & type: Canopus-class pre-dreadnought battleship
- Displacement: Full load: 14,300 long tons (14,500 t)
- Length: 421 ft 6 in (128.5 m) (loa)
- Beam: 74 ft (22.6 m)
- Draught: 26 ft (7.9 m)
- Installed power: 20 × water tube boilers; 13,500 ihp (10,100 kW)
- Propulsion: 2 × screw propellers; 2 × triple-expansion steam engines
- Speed: 18 knots (33 km/h)
- Complement: 750
- Armament: 4 × BL 12 in (305 mm) 35-caliber Mk VIII guns; 12 × QF 6 in (152 mm) 40-caliber guns; 10 × 12-pounder 76 mm (3 in) quick-firing guns; 6 × 3-pounder guns; 4 × 18 in (457 mm) torpedo tubes
- Armour: Belt: 6 in; Bulkheads: 6–10 in (152–254 mm); Barbettes: 12 in; Gun turrets: 8 in (203 mm); Casemates: 5 in (127 mm); Conning tower: 12 in; Deck: 1–2 in (25–51 mm)

HMS Goliath was a pre-dreadnought battleship of the British Royal Navy and a member of the Canopus class. Intended for service in Asia, Goliath and her sister ships were smaller and faster than the preceding Majestic-class battleships, but retained the same battery of four 12-inch (305 mm) guns. She also carried thinner armour, but incorporated new Krupp steel, which was more effective than the Harvey armour used in the Majestics. Goliath was laid down in January 1897, launched in March 1898, and commissioned into the fleet in March 1900.

The ship was deployed to the China Station from her commissioning until 1903, when she returned to Britain; she was sent back to East Asian waters, but while en route was reassigned to the Mediterranean Fleet. In early 1906, she was transferred to the Channel Fleet, followed by a stint in the Home Fleet starting in early 1907. She was sent to the Mediterranean a second time in 1908, and later returned to the Home Fleet in 1909, before being decommissioned in 1913. With the outbreak of the First World War in August 1914, Goliath was mobilised into the 8th Battle Squadron. She initially served as a guard ship in Loch Ewe, one of the harbours used by the Grand Fleet, before escorting the crossing of British troops to Belgium in late August.

Goliath then took part in operations against German East Africa, participating in the blockade of the German light cruiser SMS Königsberg in the Rufiji River. From March 1915, she was part of the Dardanelles Campaign, and remained in support of the landings at Gallipoli in April. On 13 May 1915 Goliath was sunk in Morto Bay off Cape Helles by three torpedoes from the Ottoman destroyer Muâvenet-i Millîye. Out of her crew of 750, 570 were killed in the sinking.

== Design ==
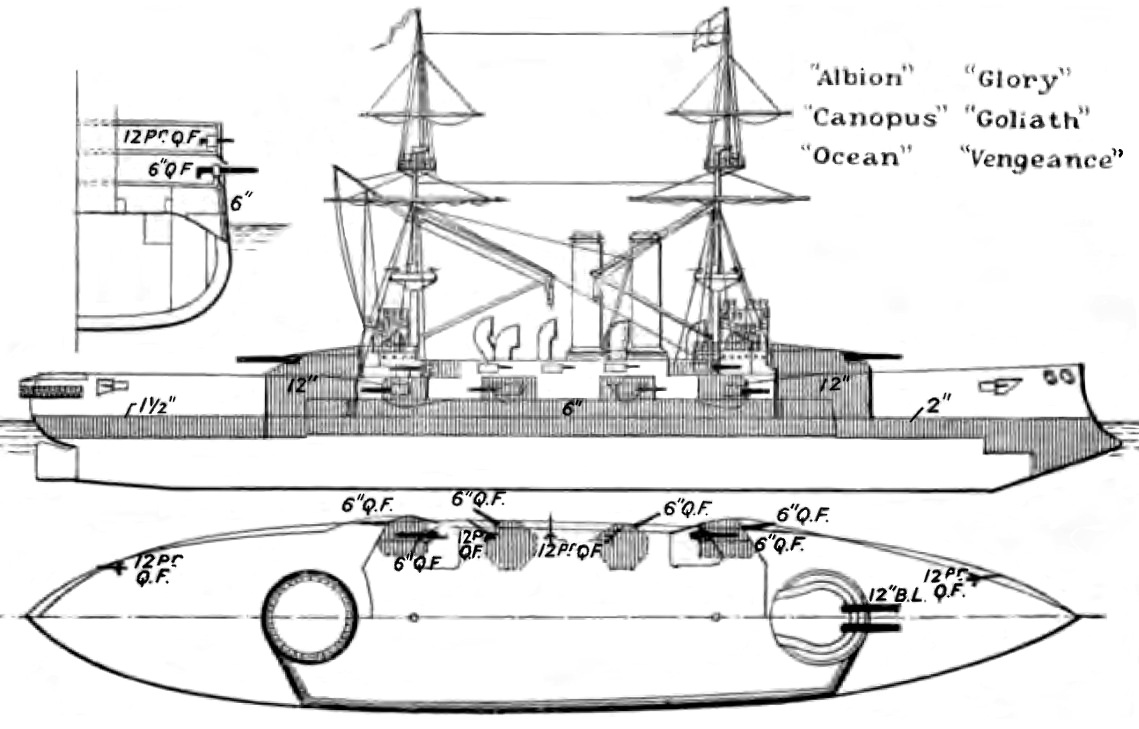
Right elevation, deck plan and hull section as depicted in Brassey's Naval Annual 1906

Goliath and her five sister ships were designed for service in East Asia, where the new rising power Japan was beginning to build a powerful navy, though this role was quickly made redundant by the Anglo-Japanese Alliance of 1902. The ships were designed to be smaller, lighter and faster than their predecessors, the Majestic-class battleships. Goliath was 421 feet 6 inches (128.47 m) long overall, with a beam of 74 ft (23 m) and a draft of 26 ft 2 in (7.98 m). She displaced 13,150 long tons (13,360 t) normally and up to 14,300 long tons (14,500 t) fully loaded. Her crew numbered 682 officers and ratings.

The Canopus-class ships were powered by a pair of 3-cylinder triple-expansion engines, with steam provided by twenty Belleville boilers. They were the first British battleships with water-tube boilers, which generated more power at less expense in weight compared with the fire-tube boilers used in previous ships. The new boilers led to the adoption of fore-and-aft funnels, rather than the side-by-side funnel arrangement used in many previous British battleships. The Canopus-class ships proved to be good steamers, with a high speed for battleships of their time—18 knots (33 km/h; 21 mph) from 13,500 indicated horsepower (10,100 kW)—a full two knots faster than the Majestics.

Goliath had a main battery of four 12-inch (305 mm) 35-calibre guns mounted in twin-gun turrets fore and aft; these guns were mounted in circular barbettes that allowed all-around loading, although at a fixed elevation. The ships also mounted a secondary battery of twelve 6-inch (152 mm) 40-calibre guns mounted in casemates, in addition to ten 12-pounder guns and six 3-pounder guns for defence against torpedo boats. As was customary for battleships of the period, she was also equipped with four 18-inch (457 mm) torpedo tubes submerged in the hull, two on each broadside near the forward and aft barbette.

To save weight, Goliath carried less armour than the Majestics—6 inches (152 mm) in the belt compared to 9 in (229 mm)—although the change from Harvey armour in the Majestics to Krupp armour in Goliath meant that the loss in protection was not as great as it might have been, Krupp armour having greater protective value at a given weight than its Harvey equivalent. Similarly, the other armour used to protect the ship could also be thinner; the bulkheads on either end of the belt were 6 to 10 in (152 to 254 mm) thick. The main battery turrets were 10 in thick, atop 12 in (305 mm) barbettes, and the casemate battery was protected with 5 in (127 mm) of Krupp steel. Her conning tower had 12 in thick sides as well. She was fitted with two armoured decks, 1 and 2 in (25 and 51 mm) thick, respectively.

== Operational history ==
=== Pre-First World War ===
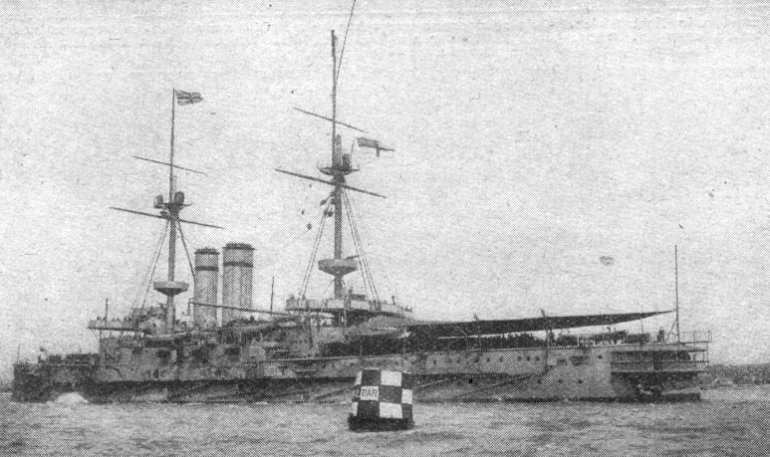
HMS Goliath

The keel for Goliath was laid down on 4 January 1897, and the completed hull was launched on 23 March 1898. The ship was commissioned on 27 March 1900 by Captain Lewis Edmund Wintz to serve on the China Station, where she arrived later the same year. She underwent a refit at Hong Kong from September 1901 – April 1902. Captain Frank Hannam Henderson was appointed in command 11 July 1902. She left the China Station in July 1903 and returned home, where she paid off into the commissioned Reserve at Chatham Dockyard on 9 October 1903. While in reserve, Goliath underwent a refit at Palmers on the Tyne from January–June 1904, then participated in maneuvers later in the year. On 9 May 1905, Goliath returned to full commission at Chatham to relieve her sister ship Ocean on the China Station. However, Great Britain and Japan ratified a treaty of alliance while she was on her outbound voyage, allowing the Royal Navy to reduce its presence on the China Station and recall all battleships from those waters; when Goliath reached Colombo, Ceylon in June 1905, she was recalled, and was instead attached to the Mediterranean Fleet. In January 1906, she was transferred to the Channel Fleet.

After being fitted with fire control, Goliath transferred to the Portsmouth Division of the new Home Fleet on 15 March 1907. She was based at Portsmouth, and underwent a machinery overhaul there from August 1907 – February 1908. Upon completion of her refit, Goliath commissioned on 4 February 1908 for Mediterranean Fleet service. During her voyage to Malta, one of her propeller shafts fractured, and she required four-month repair period before she could begin her service. On 20 April 1909, she paid off at Portsmouth. On 22 April, Goliath recommissioned to serve in the 4th Division, Home Fleet, at the Nore. During this service, she was refitted at Chatham in 1910–1911 and was sent to Sheerness. In 1913, she was mothballed and joined the 3rd Fleet.

=== First World War ===
When the First World War broke out in August 1914, Goliath returned to full commission and was assigned to the 8th Battle Squadron, Channel Fleet, operating out of Devonport. She was sent to Loch Ewe as guard ship to defend the Grand Fleet anchorage, and then covered the landing of the Plymouth Marine Battalion at Ostend, Belgium on 25 August 1914. For this operation, she and three other battleships—Vengeance, Prince George, and Caesar—a protected cruiser, and six destroyers escorted the troopships; at the same time, elements of the Grand Fleet attacked the German patrol line off Heligoland to occupy the German High Seas Fleet.

==== Operations off German East Africa ====
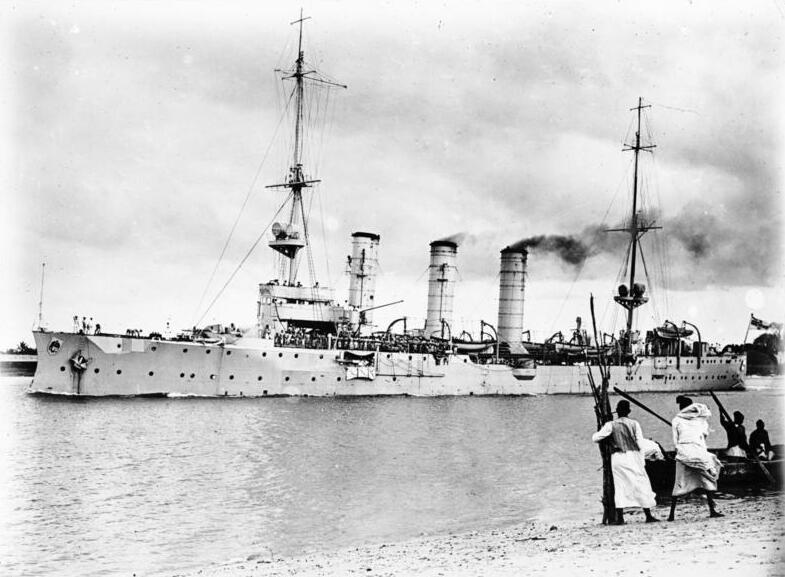
SMS Königsberg, Goliath's quarry in German East Africa

Goliath transferred to the East Indies Station on 20 September to support cruisers on convoy duty in the Middle East, escorting an Indian convoy to the Persian Gulf and German East Africa through October. This included a major troop convoy that left India on 16 October, in company with the battleship Swiftsure. Goliath's arrival allowed cruisers that had been occupied with escorting convoys to join the hunt for the German light cruiser SMS Königsberg. The German cruiser, having sunk the British cruiser Pegasus in the Battle of Zanzibar, was trapped by three British cruisers in the Rufiji River delta in late October. Goliath arrived shortly thereafter and was to join the blockade of the delta, but the news of the British defeat at the Battle of Coronel on 1 November forced the Admiralty to transfer Goliath to South Africa, as it was feared that the German East Asia Squadron might attack the colony after it entered the southern Atlantic. To further complicate matters, Goliath had engine problems on arriving in Mombasa, Kenya, and was unable to proceed to South Africa, and instead the armoured cruiser Minotaur was sent in her place. After her engines were repaired, Goliath resumed her previous assignment with the blockade force at the Rufiji delta.

In November, Goliath attempted to get close enough to neutralise Königsberg, but the water was too shallow to permit her to get within range of the cruiser. As a result, she left to bombard Dar es Salaam on 28 November and 30 November. In the former attack, Commander Henry Ritchie, Goliath's executive officer, won the Victoria Cross. Goliath and the protected cruiser Fox destroyed the colonial governor's residence; the second bombardment proved to be less effective. Goliath underwent a refit at Simonstown, South Africa, from December 1914 to February 1915. She then returned to the Rufiji delta on 25 February, as it seemed from German activities that Königsberg's commander intended to break out soon. During this period, Goliath bombarded German positions at Lindi, but she saw no action with Königsberg. On 25 March, Goliath was ordered to move to the Mediterranean to take part in operations off the Dardanelles, her place being taken by the protected cruiser Hyacinth; the battleship left East African waters a week later on 1 April.

==== Dardanelles campaign ====
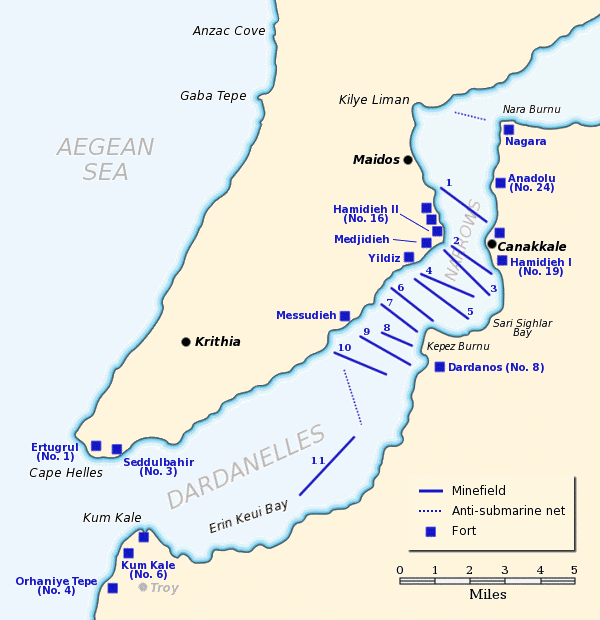
Map showing the Ottoman defences at the Dardanelles in 1915

Upon arrival in the Aegean Sea, Goliath joined the First Squadron, which included seven other battleships and four cruisers, and was commanded by Rear Admiral Rosslyn Wemyss. The First Squadron was tasked with supporting the Landing at Cape Helles, which took place on 25 April. On the morning of the landings, Goliath took up a position off Y beach, some 4,000 to 5,000 yards (3,700 to 4,600 m) offshore to provide gunfire support. The protected cruisers Sapphire and Amethyst moved in closer, and all three ships opened fire at around 05:00, signalling the start of the attack. The Ottomans made no attempt to disrupt the landing, the Allied forces having successfully launched a surprise attack. By late in the day, however, an Ottoman counterattack had advanced from Krithia to threaten the British flank, but gunfire from Goliath and the cruisers broke up the attack. That night, the Ottomans launched another counterattack, this time against the centre of the British line, which was repulsed. Once the sun began to rise, Goliath and the cruisers, which had by then been reinforced by the cruisers Talbot and Dublin, shelled the Ottomans, forcing them to retreat again.

On the morning of 26 April, wounded soldiers began to be ferried off the beach, first to Goliath and the cruisers off shore. A miscommunication with the men on shore led to an unintended, larger evacuation effort. In the course of the action, she sustained some damage from the gunfire of Ottoman forts and shore batteries. Later in the day, order was restored on shore, and the Allied troops were able to occupy Sedd el Bahr. The Allies landed reinforcements, which allowed the advance to push toward Krithia on 27 April. Goliath and several other battleships shelled Ottoman defenders around the town to support the attack, which began the following morning at around 10:00. Goliath moved as close to shore as possible, to employ all of her guns at very close range. Despite the heavy fire support, the Allied troops were unable to dislodge the Ottoman defenders, and the First Battle of Krithia ended in an Allied defeat. Goliath was damaged by Ottoman guns again on 2 May.

By mid-May, the Allied fleet had developed a rotation of two battleships on station off Gallipoli every night to support the troops dug in on the peninsula. On the night of 12–13 May, Goliath was on station with the battleship Cornwallis. The two ships were moored in Morto Bay, with Goliath ahead of Cornwallis; five destroyers patrolled the area against Ottoman torpedo boats. The Ottoman destroyer Muâvenet-i Millîye sortied late on 12 May under cover of a moonless night. By steaming very slowly, the Ottomans were able to slip past the destroyer patrols at about 01:00 on 13 May. Fifteen minutes later, lookouts aboard Goliath spotted Muâvenet-i Millîye and issued a challenge; the Ottomans replied to the challenge but very quickly increased speed and launched three torpedoes at Goliath. The British opened fire, but only managed to shoot three rounds before the first torpedo struck the ship. Two torpedoes hit almost simultaneously, the first abreast her fore turret and the second abeam the fore funnel, causing a large explosion. Goliath began to capsize almost immediately, and was lying on her side when a third torpedo struck near her after turret. Muâvenet-i Millîye sped off and escaped unscathed in the darkness as the other British warships gathered to rescue survivors from Goliath. Some 570 men, out of a crew of 750 were killed in the sinking, including the ship's commander, Captain Thomas Shelford.

The wreck lies upside down at a depth of 63 metres (207 ft), and is largely buried in sediment. Only part of the hull, which was badly mangled by the explosion, and one of her screws are visible.
