= SS Bengore Head =

SS Bengore Head can refer to one of the following ships:

- Bengore Head I was built in 1881 and was sold while fitting out to Hamburg America Line and renamed Bohemia.
- Bengore Head II was built in 1883 and was sold while fitting out to Hamburg America Line and renamed Moravia.
- SS Bengore Head III launched 1884 was a merchant ship that collided with the battleships HMS Vengeance and HMS Revenge on 13 June 1908 in Portsmouth, on the south coast of England. The collision was discussed in Parliament.
- On 20 June 1917 Bengore Head IV was torpedoed and sunk on her way from Sydney, Nova Scotia to London, UK.
- SS Bengore Head IV was launched by Irvine's Shipbuilding & Drydock Co. Ltd. in West Hartlepool in 1922. The engine was built by: Richardsons, Westgarth & Co. in Middlesbrough. On 9 May 1941 Bengore Head IV was torpedoed and lost. One crew member, William John McCabe was lost, the other crew members were rescued by the Norwegian merchant ship Borgfred and HMS Aubrietia. At the time of loss she was owned by Ulster Steamship Co. - G. Heyn & Sons Ltd of the Head Line.
- Bengore Head V was launched in 1944 in Germany, originally named Kalliope which was seized by the Allied Authorities in 1945 and renamed Empire Garrison. In 1947 she was purchased by the Ulster Steamship Co. Ltd. and renamed Bengore Head (V). In 1967 the ship was sold to Greece and renamed Aghios Nectarios. In 1972 sold to Cyprus and scrapped in 1974.
