= Morto Bay =

Coordinates: 40°03′N 26°13′E

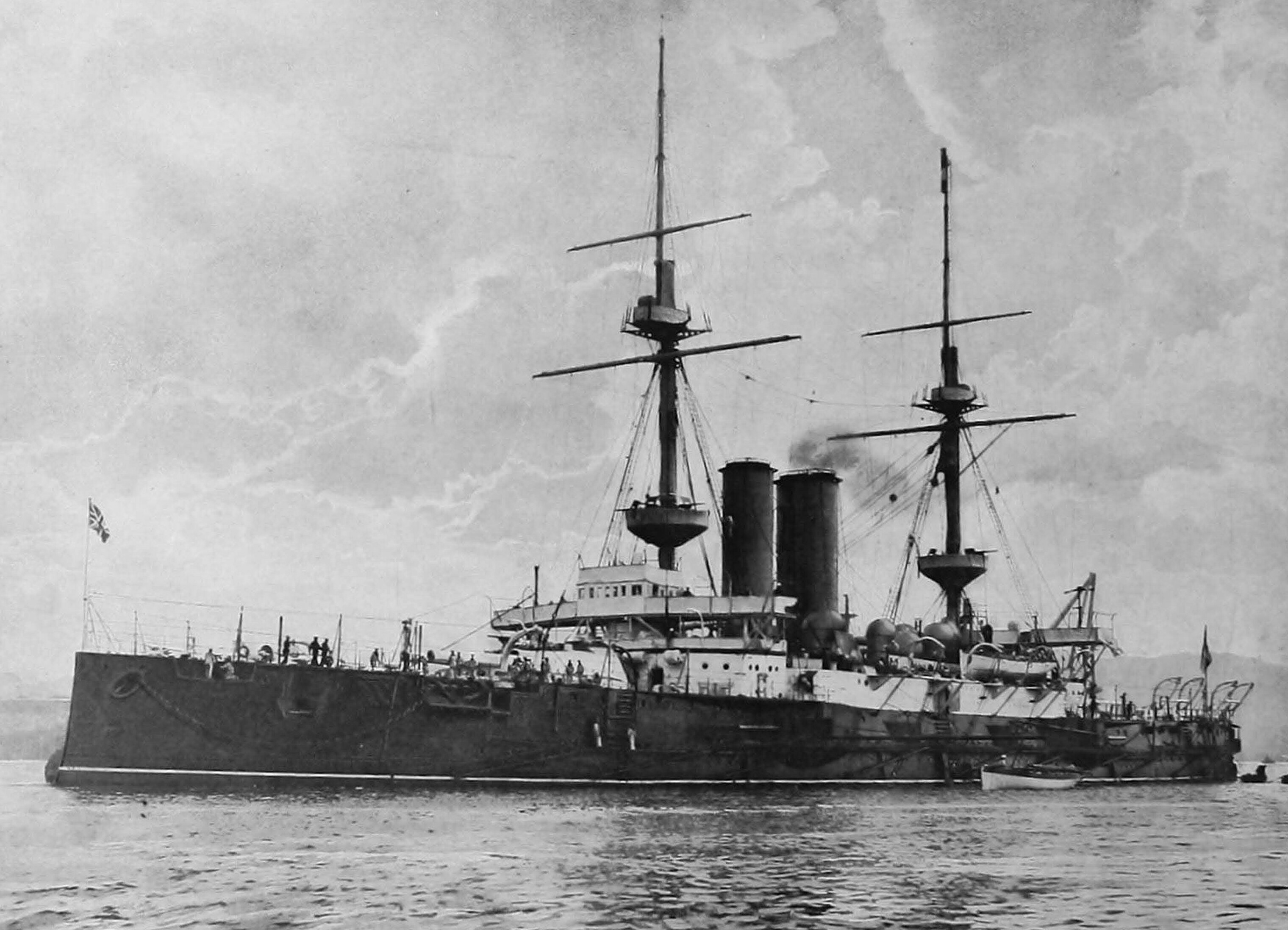
HMS Ocean (1898)

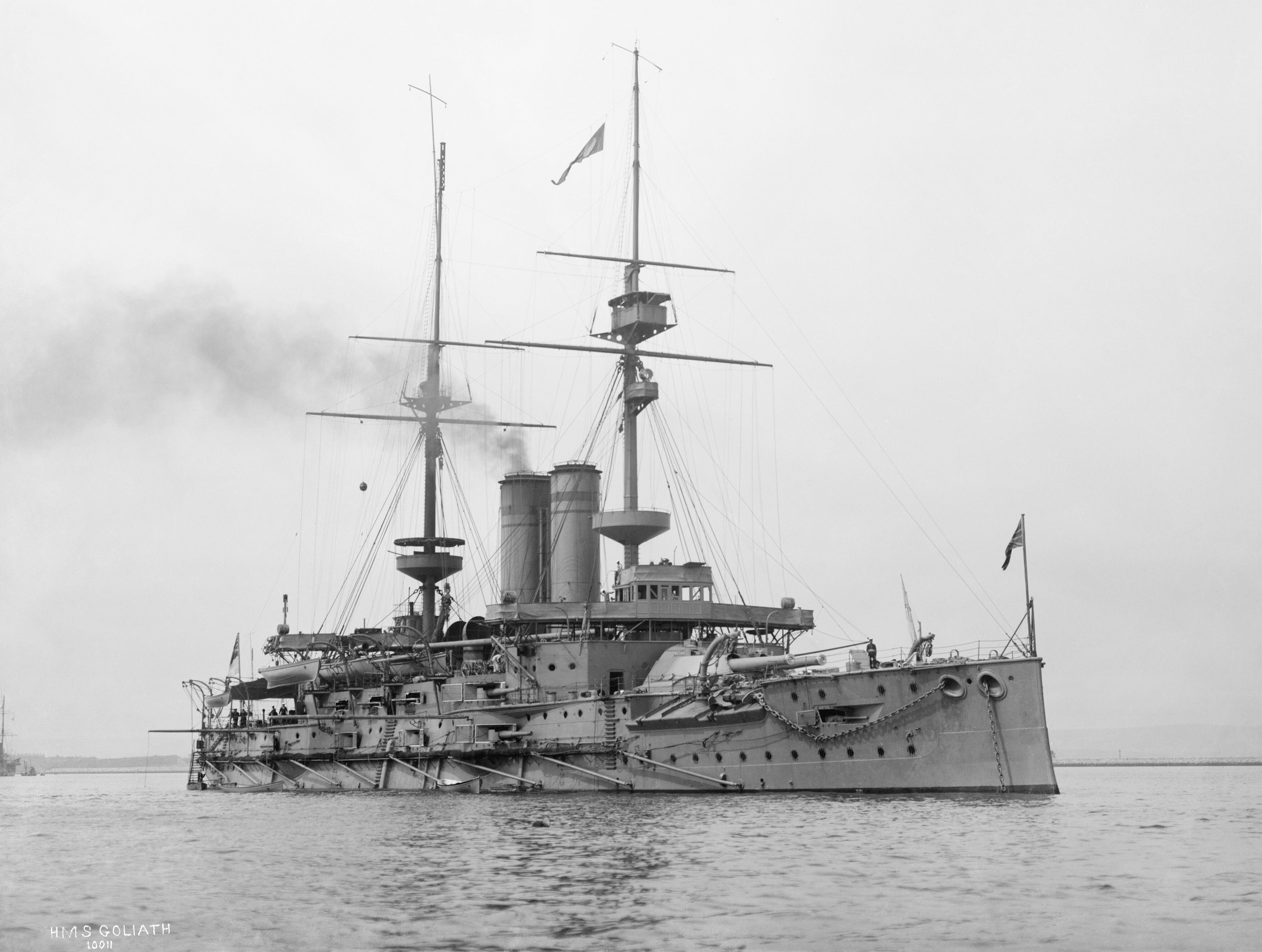
HMS Goliath (1898)

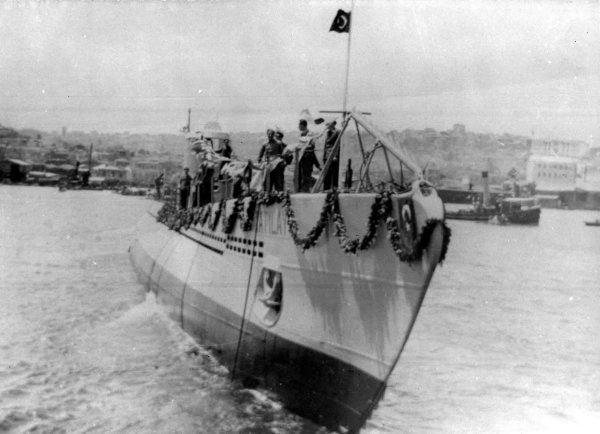
TCG Atılay

Morto Bay is an inlet on the South West tip of Cape Helles on the Gallipoli Peninsula in Turkey. The bay is in the north west (European) coast of the Dardanelles strait, which connects the Sea of Marmara to Aegean Sea. The Gallipoli Peninsula is to the north of the bay. Administratively it is a part of Çanakkale Province. The width of the bay is about 2.6 kilometres (1.6 mi) The name of the bay is probably of Italian origin.

Cape Helles was the main landing area for the Gallipoli invasion and HMS Ocean sank in Morto Bay after failing to save HMS Irresistible.

== History ==
Morto bay is known for several military activities in the past.

=== Dardanelles Campaign ===
On 18 March 1915 during the naval operations in the Dardanelles Campaign, the British battleship HMS Ocean (1898) was struck by a naval mine. It drifted to the Bay of Morto, and eventually sank.

During the land battles of the Dardanelles Campaign, the Allies of World War I landed at five different beaches of Hellespont. They were called S, V, W, X and Y by the Allies. The S-beach, which is known as Eski Hisarlık in Turkish, is the east border of the bay and Sedd el Bahr, the tip of the peninsula is to the west. The V beach, the main landing point, which is known as Ertuğrul in Turkish is close to the west border of the bay. British troops landed at both beaches on 25 April 1915. However, after the French troops drew back from the Anatolian side, the British troops in Eskihsarlık was replaced by the French troops. Now, the only French war cemetery in Gallipoli peninsula is to the north of Morto Bay.

British battleship HMS Goliath (1898), which was situated in the Bay of Morto, was tasked to bomb Turkish positions. On the night of 12–13 May 1915, Ottoman destroyer Muavenet-i Milliye torpedoed her. This event caused the resignation of Admiral John Fisher from his post as First Sea Lord, which was followed by the resignation of Winston Churchill from the cabinet.

=== 1942 ===
On 14 July 1942, Turkish submarine TCG Atılay was struck by a World War I naval mine and sank.

== Maps ==
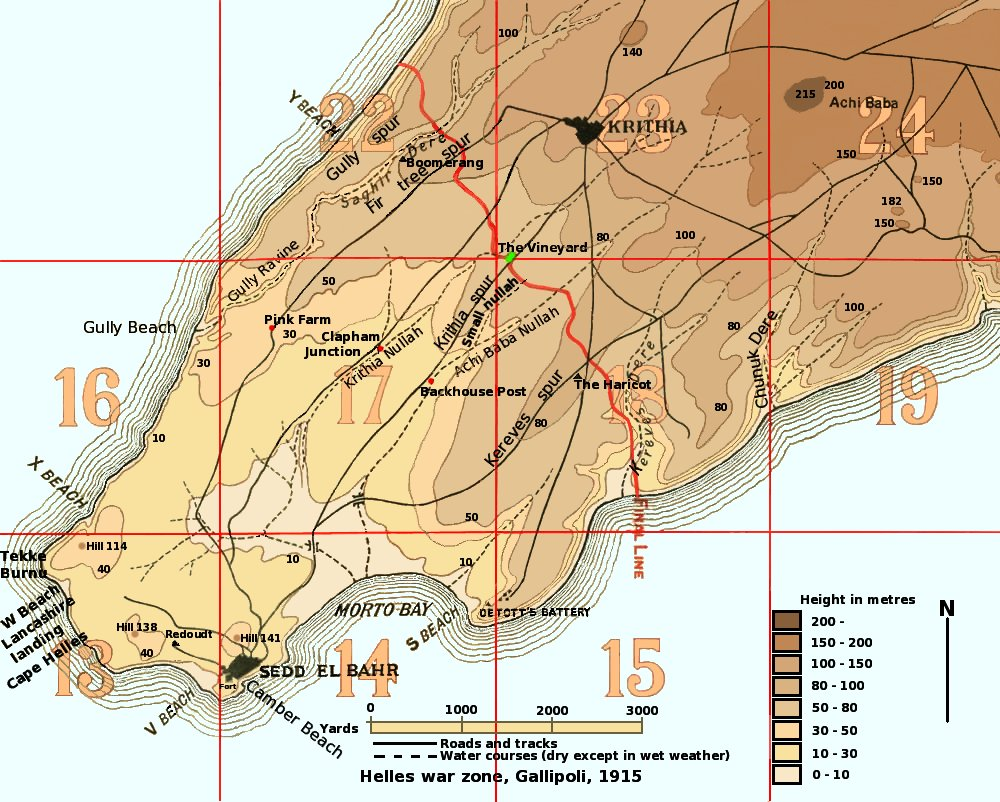
Cape Helles War Zone 1915.

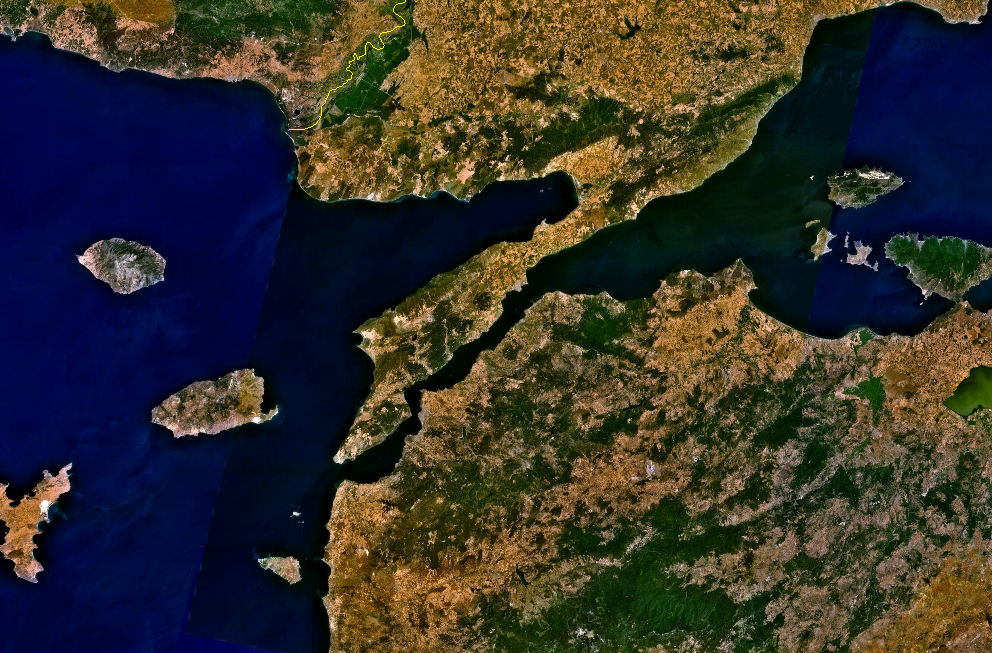
Gallipoli peninsula showing Cape Helles at the South West tip.
