= HMS Irresistible (1898) =

Pre-dreadnought battleship of the British Royal Navy

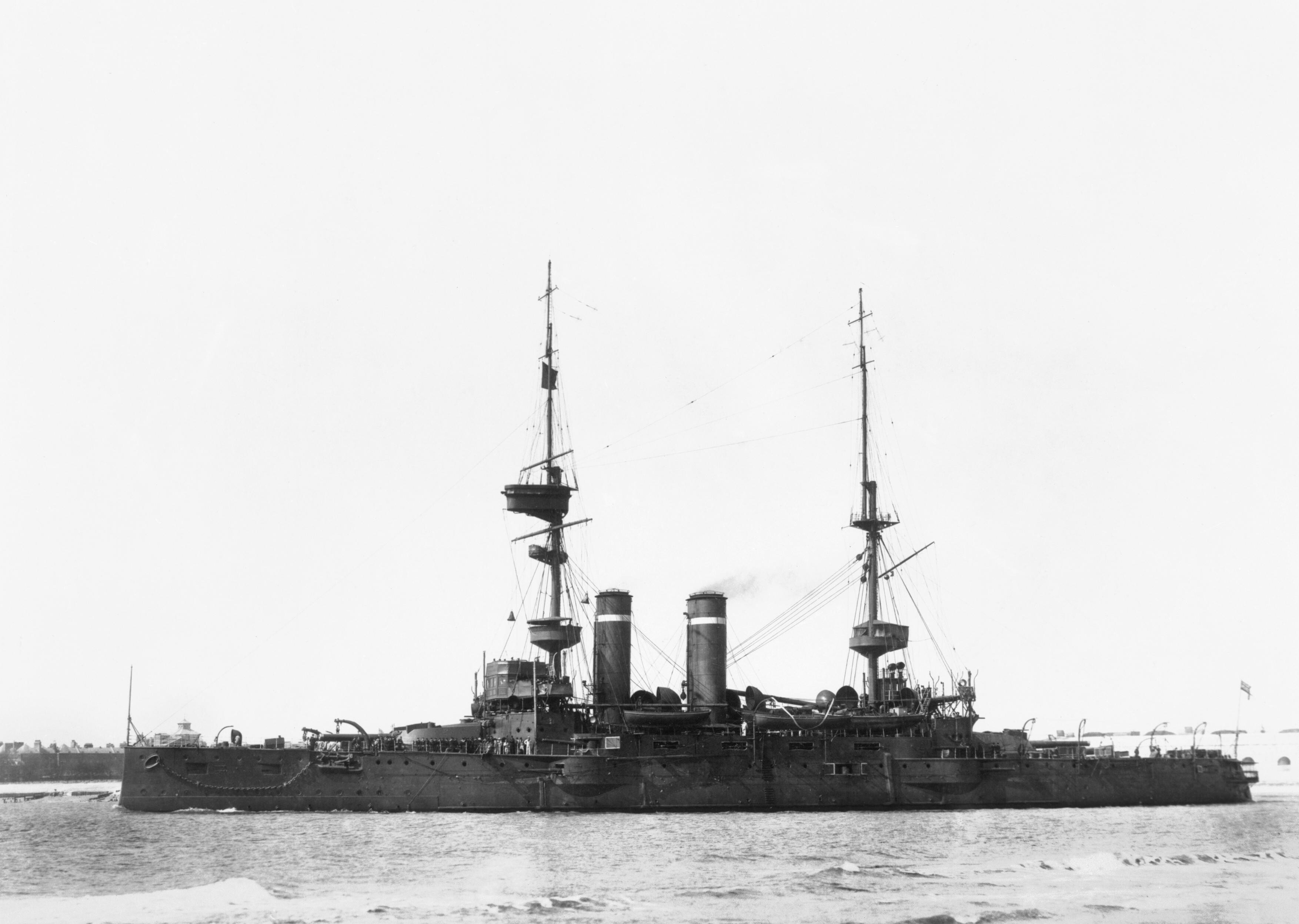
- Irresistible in 1914

History

United Kingdom
- Name: Irresistible
- Builder: Chatham Dockyard
- Laid down: 11 April 1898
- Launched: 15 December 1898
- Completed: October 1901
- Commissioned: 4 February 1902
- Fate: Mined and sunk, 18 March 1915

General characteristics
- Class & type: Formidable-class battleship
- Displacement: Normal: 14,500 long tons (14,700 t); Full load: 15,800 long tons (16,100 t)
- Length: 431 ft 9 in (131.6 m) o/a
- Beam: 75 ft (22.9 m)
- Draught: 25 ft 11 in (7.90 m)
- Installed power: 20 × water-tube boilers; 15,000 ihp (11,000 kW)
- Propulsion: 2 × triple-expansion steam engines; 2 × screw propellers
- Speed: 18 knots (33 km/h; 21 mph)
- Range: 5,500 nmi (10,190 km; 6,330 mi) at 10 knots (19 km/h; 12 mph)
- Complement: 780
- Armament: 4 × 12 in (305 mm) guns; 12 × 6 in (152 mm) guns; 10 × QF 12-pdr guns; 6 × QF 3-pdr guns; 4 × 18 in (457 mm) submerged torpedo tubes
- Armour: Belt: 9 in (229 mm); Bulkheads: 9–12 in (229–305 mm); Barbettes: 12 in (305 mm); Turrets: 10 in (254 mm); Casemates: 6 in (152 mm); Conning tower: 14 in (356 mm); Deck: 1–3 in (25–76 mm)

HMS Irresistible—the fourth British Royal Navy ship of the name—was a Formidable-class pre-dreadnought battleship. The design of these ships were developments of earlier British battleships: they mounted more powerful 40-calibre 12-inch (305 mm) guns and featured heavier armour protection, all while maintaining the preceding Canopus class' top speed of 19 knots (35 km/h; 22 mph).

Irresistible was laid down in April 1898, was launched in December that year, and was completed in October 1901. Commissioned in 1902, she initially served with the Mediterranean Fleet until April 1908, when she was transferred to the Channel Fleet. Now outclassed with the emergence of the dreadnought class of ships, she entered service with the Home Fleet in 1911 following a refit. In 1912, she was assigned to the 5th Battle Squadron.

Following the outbreak of the First World War, Irresistible, along with the squadron, was assigned to the Channel Fleet. After operations with the Dover Patrol, during which she bombarded German forces in northern France, she was assigned to the Dardanelles Campaign in February 1915. She took part in numerous unsuccessful attacks on the Ottoman forts guarding the Dardanelles in February and March. These operations included several raids by landing parties to destroy Ottoman coastal artillery batteries. On 18 March, she struck a naval mine that caused extensive flooding and disabled her engines. Without power, she began to drift into the range of Turkish guns, which laid down a withering fire. Attempts to tow her failed, so her surviving crew was evacuated and Irresistible was abandoned and eventually sank. Her crew suffered around 150 killed in the sinking.

== Design ==
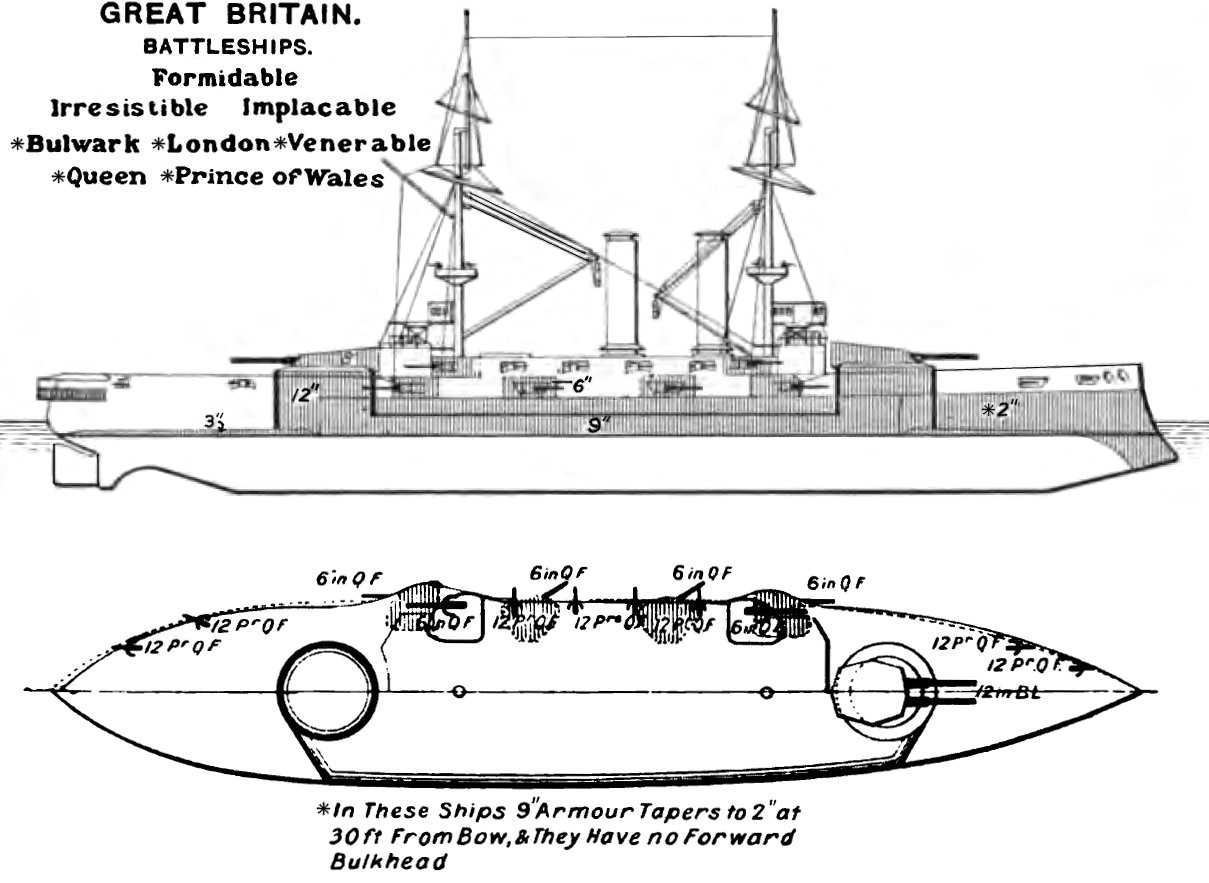
Line-drawing of the Formidable class

The design for the Formidable class was prepared in 1897; it was an incremental improvement over the preceding Majestic and Canopus classes. Formidable adopted the larger size of the Majestics, while taking the stronger Krupp armour of the Canopus design. In addition, the new design incorporated longer (and thus more powerful) main and secondary guns and an improved hull form. These characteristics produced a ship with better armour protection than either earlier class, and the same high speed of Canopus.

Irresistible was 431 feet 9 inches (131.6 m) long overall, with a beam of 75 ft (22.9 m) and a draught of 25 ft 11 in (7.90 m). She displaced 14,500 long tons (14,700 t) normally and up to 15,800 long tons (16,100 t) fully loaded. Her crew numbered 780 officers and ratings. The Formidable-class ships were powered by a pair of 3-cylinder triple-expansion engines, with steam provided by twenty Belleville boilers. The boilers were trunked into two funnels located amidships. The Formidable-class ships had a top speed of 18 knots (33 km/h; 21 mph) from 15,000 indicated horsepower (11,000 kW).

Irresistible had a main battery of four 12-inch (305 mm) 40-calibre guns mounted in twin-gun turrets fore and aft; these guns were mounted in circular barbettes that allowed all-around loading or elevation. The ships also mounted a secondary battery of twelve 6-inch (152 mm) 45-calibre guns mounted in casemates, in addition to ten 12-pounder 3 in (76 mm) guns and six 3-pounder 47 mm (1.9 in) guns for defence against torpedo boats. As was customary for battleships of the period, she was also equipped with four 18-inch (457 mm) torpedo tubes submerged in the hull.

Irresistible had an armoured belt that was 9 inches (229 mm) thick; the transverse bulkheads on either end of the belt were 9 to 12 in (229 to 305 mm) thick. Her main battery turret sides were 8 to 10 in (203 to 254 mm) thick, atop 12 in (305 mm) barbettes, and the casemate battery was protected with 6 in of Krupp steel. Her conning tower had 14 in (356 mm) thick sides as well. She was fitted with two armoured decks, 1 and 3 in (25 and 76 mm) thick, respectively.

== Service history ==
=== Pre-First World War ===
The keel for HMS Irresistible was laid down at Chatham Dockyard on 11 April 1898 and launched on 15 December 1898 in a very incomplete state to clear the building ways for the construction of the battleship Venerable. Irresistible was completed in October 1901. The ship was commissioned at Chatham Dockyard on 4 February 1902 by Captain George Morris Henderson and a complement of 870 officers and men for Mediterranean Fleet service. She left Portsmouth in late March 1902, arriving the following month at Gibraltar where she relieved the turret ship Devastation as a guard ship. In May 1902 she visited Augusta, Sicily, and in August 1902 she went to Piraeus. In late December 1902 she was back in Greek waters when she visited Astakos in the Ionian Sea with HMS Bulwark and HMS Pioneer.

She suffered two mishaps during her years in the Mediterranean, colliding with the Norwegian merchant steamer SS Clive while steaming in fog on her way to her commissioning on 3 March 1902, sustaining considerable damage to the side of her hull, and running aground at Malta on 5 October 1905. She underwent a refit there after her grounding, and a second refit there between October 1907 and January 1908. In April 1908, Irresistible was transferred to the Channel Fleet, where she collided with a schooner while steaming in fog on 4 May 1908, suffering no damage. She was assigned to the Nore Division in 1909, and was reduced to a nucleus crew in May 1910. Her Channel Fleet service ended on 1 June 1910, when she paid off at Chatham Dockyard for a refit. Her refit completed, Irresistible commissioned at Chatham on 28 February 1911 to serve in the 3rd Division, Home Fleet, at the Nore. In 1912, she was assigned to the 5th Battle Squadron.

=== First World War ===
Britain entered the First World War in August 1914; the 5th Battle Squadron was based at Portland and assigned to patrol duties in the English Channel under the Channel Fleet. Irresistible covered the landing of the Plymouth Marine Battalion at Ostend, Belgium, on 25 August, and thereafter covered the occupation. In October–November 1914, Irresistible was temporarily attached to the Dover Patrol. Her duties included bombardment of German Army forces along the Belgian coast in support of Allied troops fighting on the front. On 3 November, she was detached to support East Coast Patrols during the German raid on Yarmouth, though she did not see action with German warships. Irresistible returned to the Channel Fleet later in November 1914. The 5th Battle Squadron was transferred to Sheerness on 14 November to guard against a possible German invasion. The squadron was transferred back to Portland on 30 December.

==== Dardanelles campaign ====
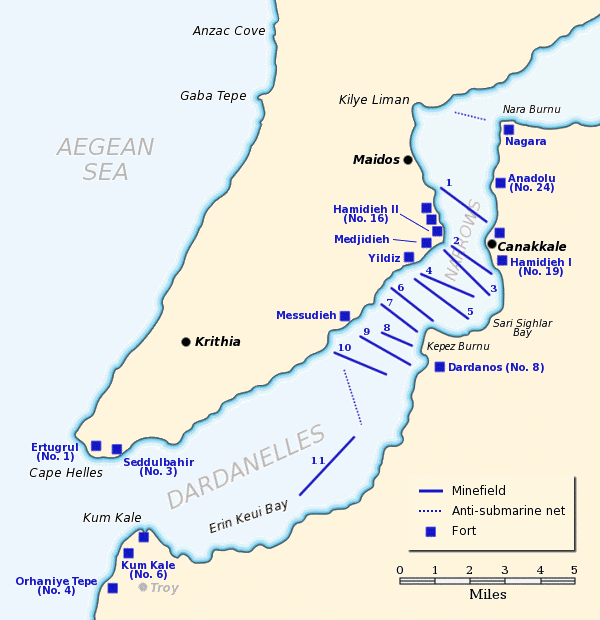
Map showing the Ottoman defences at the Dardanelles in 1915

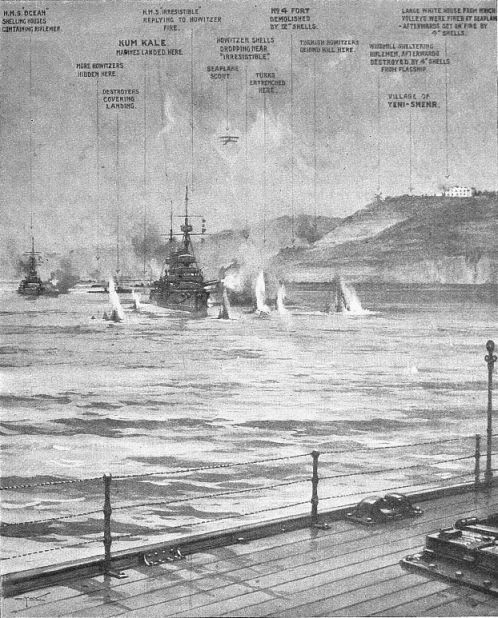
HMS Irresistible and HMS Ocean shelling the Kum Kale and other forts on the Asiatic side

On 1 February 1915, Irresistible sailed from Sheerness in company with the battleship Majestic, bound for the eastern Mediterranean Sea. There, the British and French fleets, under the overall command of British Admiral Sackville Carden, were preparing to launch a major attack on the Dardanelles strait; the Entente commanders hoped to force the Dardanelles and enter the Sea of Marmara, where they could attack the capital of the Ottoman Empire, Constantinople, directly. She took part in the opening bombardment of the Ottoman forts guarding the entrance to the Çanakkale (Dardanelles) on 18–19 February as part of the 2nd Division, though she did not actively engage the Ottoman coastal defences during the attack.

Another attack took place on 25 February; Irresistible and the battleship Agamemnon being tasked with providing long-range covering fire while other battleships closed with the fortresses to engage them directly. During their operation, the battleship Albion came under fire from the 9.4-inch (239 mm) guns from Battery "Orkaniye". Counter fire from Irresistible forced the Ottomans to cease firing, knocking out two guns in the process. By 15:00, the leading British and French battleships had silenced the Ottoman guns, allowing for minesweepers to advance and attempt to clear the minefields; most of the fleet withdrew while the minesweepers worked. By clearing these fields, Allied warships could now enter the Dardanelles themselves, opening the route to attack additional fortifications around the town of Dardanus. While other vessels shelled the forts there, Irresistible and the battleship Vengeance sent men ashore to destroy an abandoned artillery battery near Kumkale, with both ships remaining off shore to support the raid. The 75-man team from Irresistible landed unopposed at Sedd el Bahr, but quickly came under attack from a superior Ottoman force and was compelled to retreat. 6-inch fire from Irresistible broke up the Ottoman attack, however, and the landing party was able to make their way to the fort, where they found four of the six heavy guns still operable. They destroyed the guns with gunpowder from the Ottoman magazine before proceeding to Fort Helles. The Ottoman defences were too strong there, and so the British party retreated after they destroyed a pair of 12-pounder guns outside the fort.

Two days later, Irresistible repeated the operation with another 78-man landing party under the command of Lieutenant F. H. Sandford, again at Sedd el Bahr. This time, the target was a battery of six 6-inch Krupp mortars. The men again came under attack from the Ottoman defenders, and again forced their way to their objective using heavy fire from Irresistible's 6-inch guns to suppress the Ottomans. All six mortars were packed with gunpowder and destroyed, and the landing party returned to the ship without a single casualty. The following day, Admiral John de Robeck, the British fleet commander, transferred his flag from Vengeance to Irresistible, while the latter was in Mudros for repairs. De Robeck ordered another attack on 28 February, though bad weather hampered British progress; later in the day, a break in the weather led him to order Irresistible's landing party, again under Sandford's direction, to go ashore. In the course of the raid, the party destroyed eight heavy guns in a battery near Kumkale, six 12-pounder field guns, and four Nordenfelt guns on the way back to the ship. Again, the men returned without a single casualty.

On 3 March, another attack was launched against the fortresses, and Irresistible contributed a reconnaissance party that went ashore under cover of a heavy bombardment from the fleet's battleships. During their exploration of the area around Erenköy, they discovered a battery of six 15-pounder field guns, which they destroyed. They proceeded to the main fort and found that it had been evacuated under the heavy bombardment. Again, they returned to the ship with no casualties. The next day, a larger landing force of marines went ashore; Irresistible provided support off Kumkale. After the landing party came under sniper fire from windmills above the village, Irresistible demolished them before shifting fire to the town itself. The Ottoman fire proved to be too heavy, however, and the marines had to retreat to their ships. Irresistible remained de Robeck's flagship until 6 March, when Vengeance returned.

The next attack came on 8 March; the powerful superdreadnought Queen Elizabeth, with her 15-inch (380 mm) guns, was to demolish the main Ottoman fortress at Rumili, the "Hamidieh I", "Hamidieh II", and "Namazieh" batteries, and the fortress at Chemenlik. While she attacked those objectives, Irresistible and three other battleships were tasked with covering her from mobile field guns in the straits. Poor visibility hampered British shooting and made it easy for the Ottoman field guns to continually shoot and relocate before the battleships could locate them and return fire. The repeated failures to destroy the fortresses guarding the straits convinced the British command that further attempts were pointless until the minefields protecting the fortresses could be cleared, which would allow the battleships to engage and destroy them at very close range. Accordingly, trawlers were sent in during the night to clear the minefields while the British and French fleets replenished ammunition and gathered reinforcements. While this work was ongoing, Irresistible, Albion, and the battleship Prince George were sent in on 9 March to raid Ottoman defences; Irresistible inflicted damage on a bridge used to support the fort at Kumkale. The next morning, Irresistible, the battleship Cornwallis, the light cruiser Dublin, and the seaplane carrier Ark Royal made another foray to attack targets of opportunity.

==== Loss ====
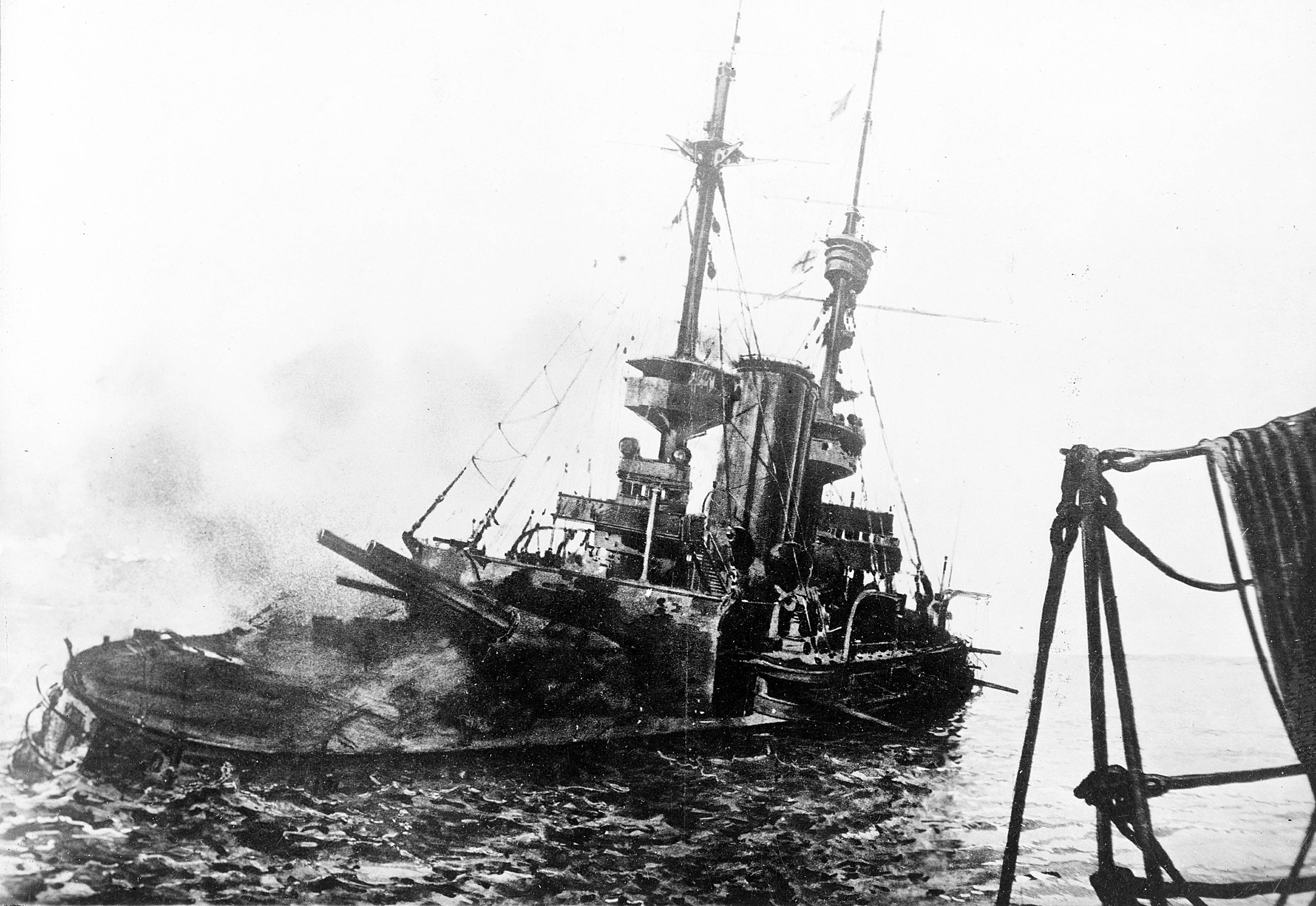
Irresistible listing and sinking in the Dardanelles, 18 March 1915. Photograph taken from the battleship Lord Nelson

By mid-March, it had become clear that the plan to sweep the minefields had failed. In response, de Robeck, who had succeeded Carden as the commander of the Dardanelles campaign, proposed to launch a major daylight attack on the fortresses, suppress them as well as possible at longer range, and to clear the minefields at the same time. This would then allow the battleships to demolish the forts at close range. Ottoman opposition was expected to be very heavy, as they had been reinforcing their defences throughout the campaign; by this time, they had massed forty-two guns 8 inches (203 mm) or larger, along with numerous mobile field guns. The attack was launched on 18 March, and Irresistible was again part of 2nd Division, which formed the second wave of the attack. Irresistible joined the fray at 14:39, shortly after the French battleship Bouvet was mined and sunk in the straits; she and several other battleships attempted to suppress Ottoman guns that were firing on boats that were picking up survivors from Bouvet. Irresistible engaged the "Namazieh" Battery, which at that time was not actively firing. She quickly came under heavy fire from the "Hamidieh I" battery, which targeted the ship with four-shell salvos.

At 15:14, Irresistible was rocked by an explosion, and by 15:32, had begun to take on a list, prompting de Robeck to order her to withdraw to avoid further damage. At 16:15, Irresistible, having idled her engines, struck a mine that caused extensive damage to the ship. The mine detonated under her starboard engine room, flooding it and killing all but three of the men on duty there. The bulkhead that divided the starboard from the port engine room collapsed under the sudden weight of water, disabling that engine as well. Unable to maneuver, with a list of 7 degrees to starboard, and down by the stern, Irresistible became an attractive target for the Ottoman gunners. She drifted helplessly into range of Turkish guns, which laid down a heavy fire on her. Her main gun turrets began to malfunction, and she was obscured by smoke and spray. De Robeck ordered the battleship Ocean to take her under tow and pull her out of range of the Ottoman guns, and the destroyer Wear came alongside and rescued most of the crew—28 officers and 582 men—despite the punishing Ottoman shelling. A group of ten men remained aboard to try to secure a line from Ocean. By the time Ocean had arrived it had become clear that Irresistible could not be saved. Her list had increased and the fire from the Ottoman guns had become very heavy, so the remaining men were evacuated and Ocean began to withdraw.

With the heavy losses that day—Bouvet, Irresistible, and Ocean, which had been mined and disabled after withdrawing from her attempt to rescue Irresistible—de Robeck issued the order to break off the attack. That evening, the destroyer Jed entered the Dardanelles to torpedo and sink the two abandoned battleships to prevent their capture in case they had remained afloat, but could find no sign of them. The Ottomans later reported that the derelict Irresistible had drifted closer to shore and suffered further severe damage from their shore batteries before sinking at about 19:30. Irresistible's crew suffered about 150 casualties during her sinking.
