= HMS Glory (1899) =

Pre-dreadnought battleship of the British Royal Navy

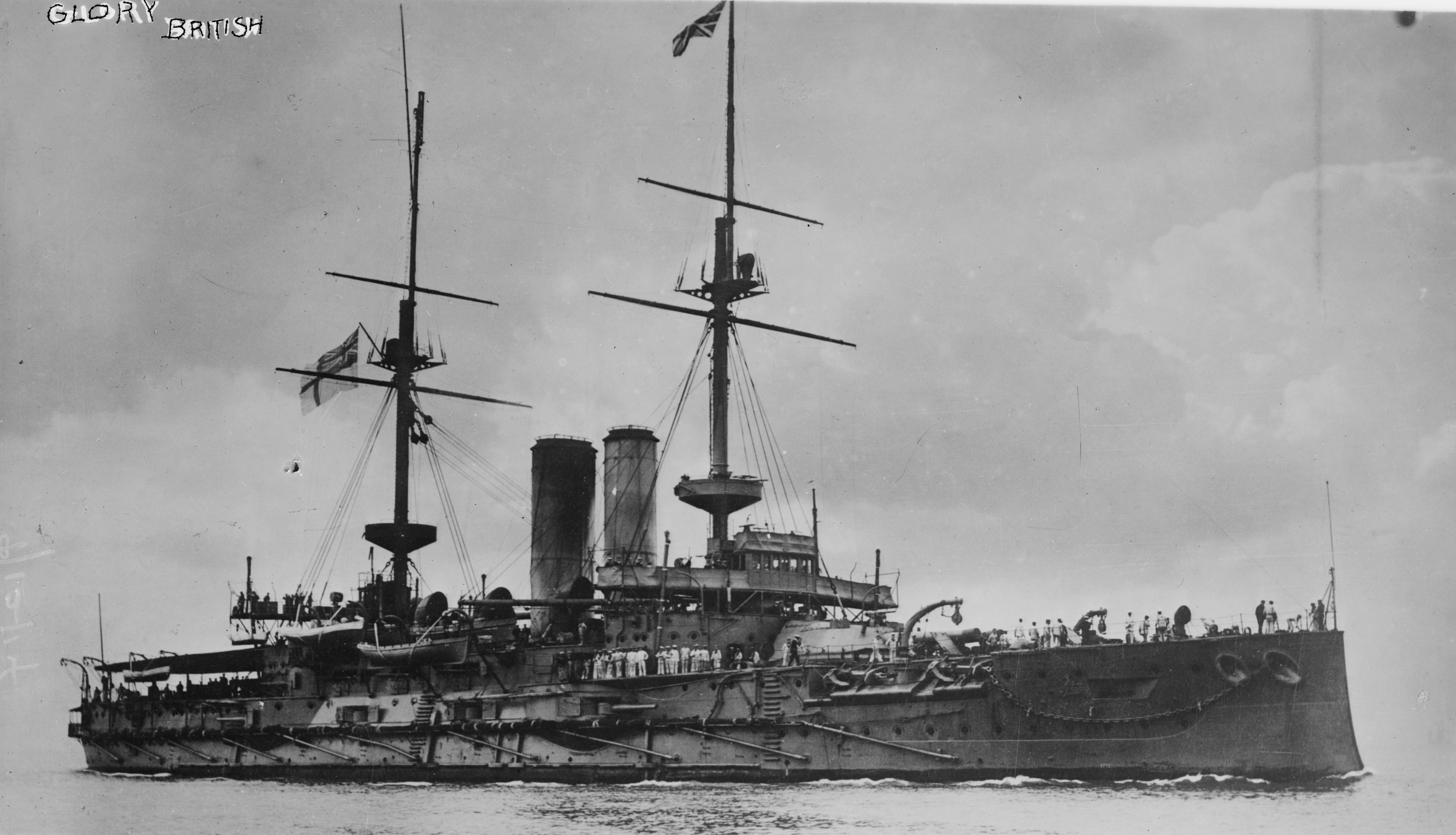
- HMS Glory between 1910 and 1915.

History

United Kingdom
- Name: HMS Glory
- Builder: Laird Brothers, Birkenhead
- Laid down: 1 December 1896
- Launched: 11 March 1899
- Commissioned: 1 November 1900
- Decommissioned: 17 September 1921
- Renamed: HMS Crescent April 1920
- Fate: Sold for scrapping 19 December 1922

General characteristics
- Class & type: Canopus-class pre-dreadnought battleship
- Displacement: Full load: 14,300 long tons (14,500 t)
- Length: 421 ft 6 in (128.5 m) (loa)
- Beam: 74 ft (22.6 m)
- Draught: 26 ft (7.9 m)
- Installed power: 20 × water tube boilers; 13,500 ihp (10,100 kW)
- Propulsion: 2 × screw propellers; 2 × triple-expansion steam engines
- Speed: 18 knots (33 km/h)
- Complement: 750
- Armament: 4 × BL 12 in (305 mm) 35-caliber Mk VIII guns; 12 × QF 6 in (152 mm) 40-caliber guns; 10 × 12-pounder 76 mm (3 in) quick-firing guns; 6 × 3-pounder guns; 4 × 18 in (457 mm) torpedo tubes
- Armour: Belt: 6 in; Bulkheads: 6–10 in (152–254 mm); Barbettes: 12 in; Gun turrets: 8 in (203 mm); Casemates: 5 in (127 mm); Conning tower: 12 in; Deck: 1–2 in (25–51 mm)

HMS Glory was a pre-dreadnought battleship of the British Royal Navy and a member of the Canopus class. Intended for service in Asia, Glory and her sister ships were smaller and faster than the preceding Majestic-class battleships, but retained the same battery of four 12-inch (305 mm) guns. She also carried thinner armour, but incorporated new Krupp steel, which was more effective than the Harvey armour used in the Majestics. Glory was laid down in December 1896, launched in March 1899, and commissioned into the fleet in November 1900.

Glory spent much of her peacetime career abroad. She was assigned to the China Station from 1901 to 1905, before returning to British waters for a brief stint with the Channel Fleet and then the Home Fleet from late 1905 to early 1907. After a refit in 1907, she was then sent to the Mediterranean Fleet, where she remained until April 1909. She then returned to Britain and was reduced to reserve status. She remained inactive until the outbreak of the First World War in August 1914, at which time she was mobilised into the 8th Battle Squadron.

In October 1914, Glory was transferred to the North America and West Indies Station, where she served as the squadron flagship. In June 1915, she was reassigned to the Mediterranean, and she took part in the Dardanelles Campaign, though she saw little action during that time, as her crew was needed ashore to support the troops fighting in the Gallipoli campaign. In August 1916, Glory was sent to Murmansk, Russia, to support Britain's ally by keeping the vital port open for supplies being sent for the Eastern Front. There, she served as the flagship of the British North Russia Squadron, including during the Allied intervention in the Russian Civil War. By that time, she was the last British pre-dreadnought still in active service. She returned to Britain in late 1919, was decommissioned, and was renamed HMS Crescent in 1920, before ultimately being sold to ship breakers in December 1922.

== Design ==
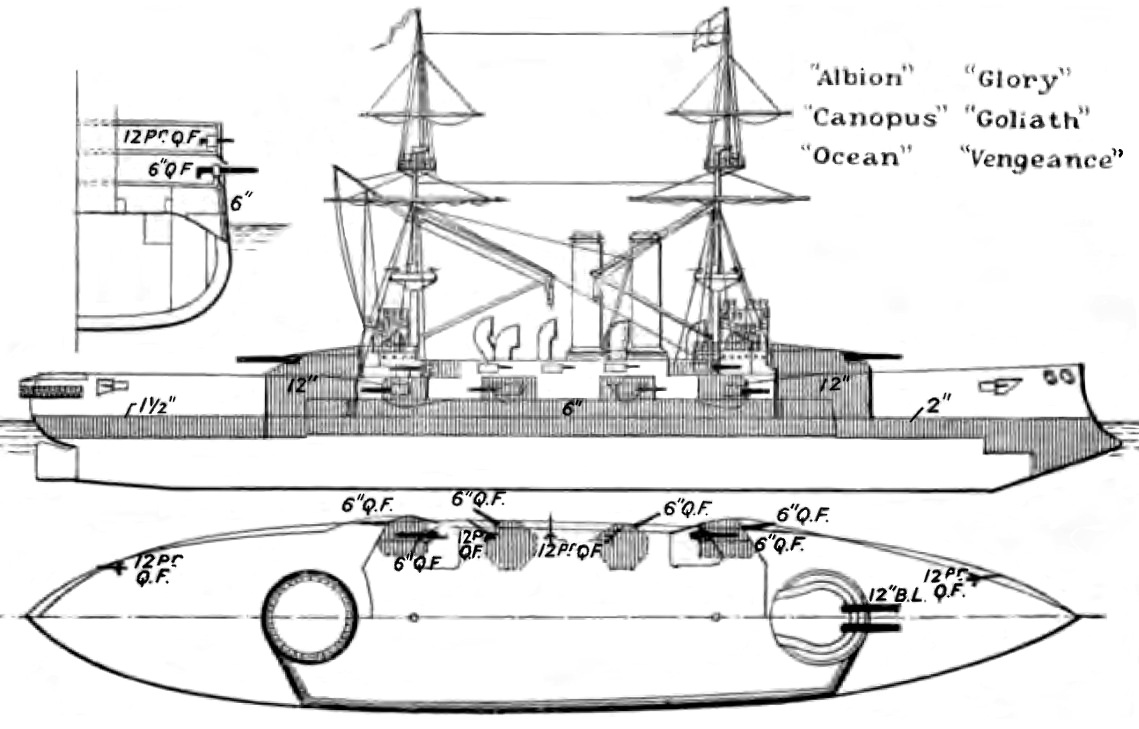
Right elevation, deck plan and hull section as depicted in Brassey's Naval Annual 1906

Glory and her five sister ships were designed for service in East Asia, where the new rising power Japan was beginning to build a powerful navy, though this role was quickly made redundant by the Anglo-Japanese Alliance of 1902. The ships were designed to be smaller, lighter and faster than their predecessors, the Majestic-class battleships. Glory was 421 feet 6 inches (128.47 m) long overall, with a beam of 74 ft (23 m) and a draft of 26 ft 2 in (7.98 m). She displaced 13,150 long tons (13,360 t) normally and up to 14,300 long tons (14,500 t) fully loaded. Her crew numbered 682 officers and ratings.

The Canopus-class ships were powered by a pair of 3-cylinder triple-expansion engines, with steam provided by twenty Belleville boilers. They were the first British battleships with water-tube boilers, which generated more power at less expense in weight compared with the fire-tube boilers used in previous ships. The new boilers led to the adoption of fore-and-aft funnels, rather than the side-by-side funnel arrangement used in many previous British battleships. The Canopus-class ships proved to be good steamers, with a high speed for battleships of their time—18 knots (33 km/h; 21 mph) from 13,500 indicated horsepower (10,100 kW)—a full two knots faster than the Majestics.

Glory had a main battery of four 12-inch (305 mm) 35-calibre guns mounted in twin-gun turrets fore and aft; these guns were mounted in circular barbettes that allowed all-around loading, although at a fixed elevation. The ships also mounted a secondary battery of twelve 6-inch (152 mm) 40-calibre guns mounted in casemates, in addition to ten 12-pounder guns and six 3-pounder guns for defence against torpedo boats. As was customary for battleships of the period, she was also equipped with four 18-inch (457 mm) torpedo tubes submerged in the hull, two on each broadside near the forward and aft barbette.

To save weight, Glory carried less armour than the Majestics—6 inches (152 mm) in the belt compared to 9 in (229 mm)—although the change from Harvey armour in the Majestics to Krupp armour in Glory meant that the loss in protection was not as great as it might have been, Krupp armour having greater protective value at a given weight than its Harvey equivalent. Similarly, the other armour used to protect the ship could also be thinner; the bulkheads on either end of the belt were 6 to 10 in (152 to 254 mm) thick. The main battery turrets were 10 in thick, atop 12 in (305 mm) barbettes, and the casemate battery was protected with 5 in (127 mm) of Krupp steel. Her conning tower had 12 in thick sides as well. She was fitted with two armoured decks, 1 and 2 in (25 and 51 mm) thick, respectively.

== Service history ==
=== Pre-First World War ===
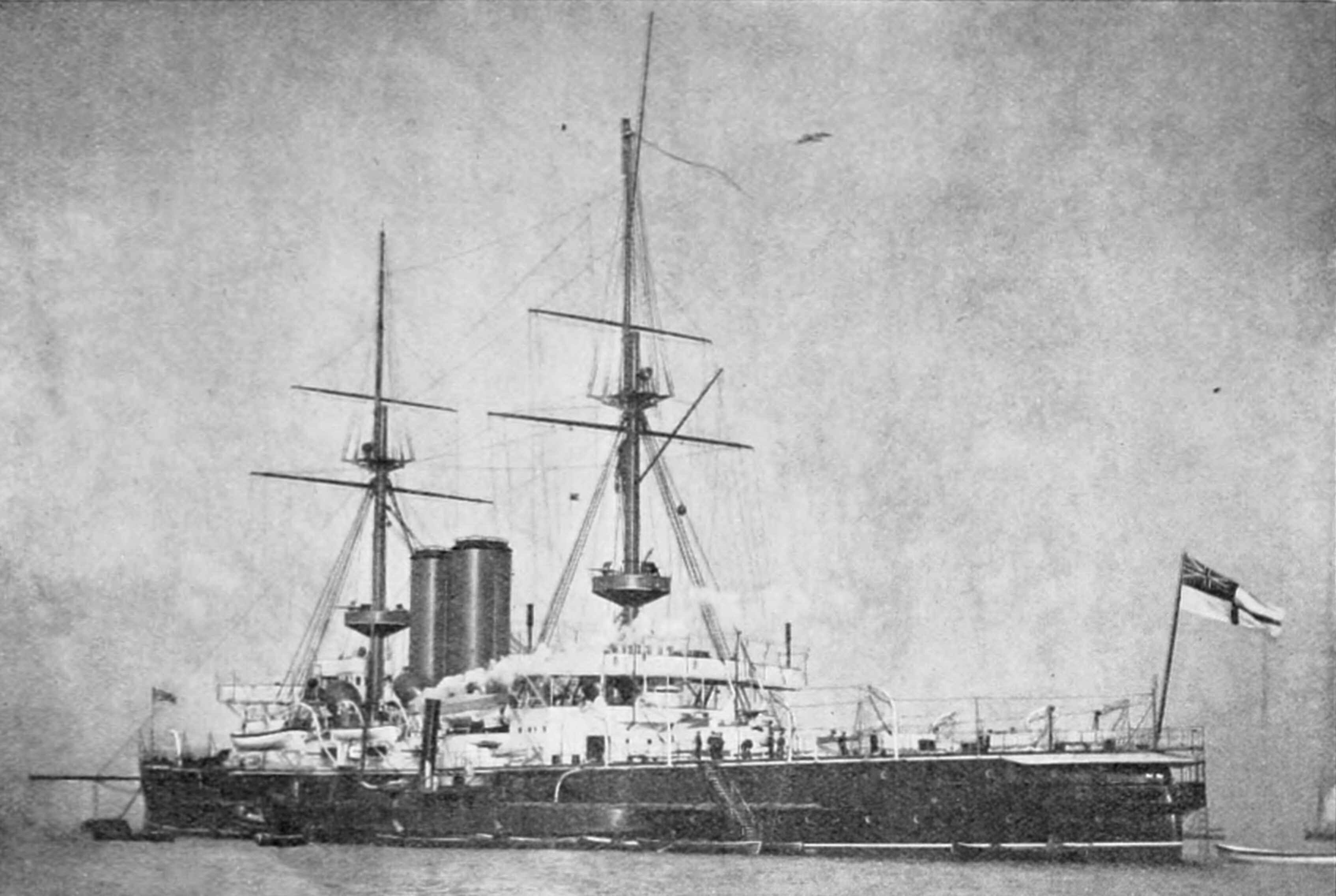
Glory, c. 1903

HMS Glory was laid down at the Laird Brothers shipyard in Birkenhead on 1 December 1896. She was launched on 11 March 1899, and was commissioned on 1 November 1900 for service on the China Station, departing the United Kingdom for China on 24 November 1900 under the command of Captain Frederick Inglefield. While there, she collided with the battleship Centurion during a storm at Hong Kong on 17 April 1901, when Centurion drifted across her bows, but Glory suffered no damage. In June 1901, Vice-Admiral Sir Cyprian Bridge, about to succeed as Commander-in-Chief of the China Station, hoisted his flag on the ship, and Captain Arthur William Carter succeeded Inglefield in command. Glory refitted at Hong Kong in 1901–1902. In November 1902 she visited Shanghai, and in February the following year she spent a week in Manila, accompanied by the cruiser Talbot and the despatch vessel Alacrity. In April 1903, Glory and the protected cruiser Blenheim joined a naval review held for the Japanese Emperor Meiji in Kobe, Japan. The foreign naval contingent included the Italian protected cruiser Calabria, the German protected cruiser SMS Hansa, the French protected cruiser Pascal, and the Russian protected cruiser Askold. In 1905, the United Kingdom and Japan ratified a treaty of alliance that reduced the need for a Royal Navy presence on the China Station, and all battleships there were ordered to return to Britain. As a result, Glory was recalled from China in July 1905, departing Hong Kong on 22 July 1905.

Glory paid off at Portsmouth on 2 October 1905. She returned to full commission on 24 October 1905 for service in the Channel Fleet. On 31 October 1906, she transferred to the Portsmouth Reserve Division, which in January 1907 became the Portsmouth Division of the new Home Fleet. She underwent a refit at Portsmouth from March to September 1907, during which she received fire control and magazine cooling and had her machinery and boilers overhauled. Her refit completed, Glory commissioned at Portsmouth on 18 September 1907 for service in the Mediterranean Fleet. On 20 April 1909, she paid off at Portsmouth and recommissioned for reserve duty with a nucleus crew in the 4th Division, Home Fleet, at the Nore. She became part of the 3rd Fleet at the Nore in May 1912 and transferred to Portsmouth in April 1913.

=== First World War ===
When the First World War broke out in August 1914, Glory was assigned to the 8th Battle Squadron, Channel Fleet, based at Devonport, but she was detached on 5 August 1914 to serve at Halifax, Nova Scotia, Canada, as guard ship and to support the North America and West Indies Station cruiser squadron, arriving in Halifax on 17 August. She served as the flagship of the station for Admiral Robert Hornby. She escorted a Canadian troop convoy in October 1914; she rendezvoused with the convoy on 5 October off Cape Race and covered the convoy for three days. On the 8th, Glory and the rest of her squadron members left the convoy, which was thereafter protected by the battlecruiser Princess Royal and the battleship Majestic. In mid-November, following Rear-Admiral Sir Christopher Cradock's defeat at the Battle of Coronel, the Royal Navy began shifting warships south to meet the German East Asia Squadron as it rounded Cape Horn into the Atlantic. Glory was initially ordered south to join the armoured cruisers Lancaster, Essex, and Berwick and the French armoured cruiser Condé. Glory was delayed, however, as the armoured cruiser Suffolk, which was to remain off New York City to watch German liners in the port, required an overhaul.

By February 1915, the North America and West Indies Squadron consisted of Glory, six cruisers, and one armed merchant cruiser. Glory transferred to the Mediterranean in May 1915 to participate in Dardanelles campaign, arriving at the Dardanelles in June 1915. This was after the British and French fleets had made their attempts to force the straits in February, March, and April; by the time Glory arrived, the ground forces had gone ashore. As a result, the ship saw comparatively little activity. This was in large part due to the fact that Glory was selected to send a large portion of her crew ashore to assist with the landing and distribution of weapons and stores. Since she did not have a full crew, she could not support the Landing at Suvla Bay in August. Indeed, Glory had not fired her guns at all until early October, when she joined the battleship Prince George to shell Ottoman positions at Gallipoli. At the end of 1915 she left the Dardanelles and joined the Suez Canal Patrol in the Mediterranean on 4 January 1916. In April 1916, she returned to the United Kingdom and began a refit at Portsmouth that lasted until July 1916.

Glory was recommissioned on 1 August 1916 to serve as the flagship for Commodore Thomas Kemp, British North Russia Squadron, along with the protected cruiser HMS Vindictive and six minesweepers. She had some of her guns removed to increase accommodation space for more Royal Marines. In this duty, she was based at Archangel to protect supplies that arrived there for the Russian Army. The squadron's mission evolved after the Bolshevik Revolution in 1917 into preventing the supplies that had been delivered from falling into the hands of the Red Army. Nevertheless, Kemp maintained good relations with the local communist leadership; on 6 March 1918, Kemp reached an agreement with the authorities in Murmansk to send ashore a party of 130 marines from Glory to help defend the city from a feared invasion by neighboring Finland. She sent further men to reinforce the marines, along with Lewis guns and a 12-pounder gun, the latter from the armoured cruiser Cochrane. Finnish forces attempted to seize nearby Pechenga as a first step toward advancing on Murmansk, but the attack broke down after Cochrane contributed marines and gunfire support to its defence. Finnish forces no longer threatened Murmansk.

Glory remained in northern Russia during the Allied intervention in the Russian Civil War in late 1918 and into 1919. By that time, Glory was the last remaining British pre-dreadnought still in active, front-line service. In September 1919, Glory returned to the United Kingdom. She paid off into care and maintenance on 1 November 1919 at Sheerness. She was renamed HMS Crescent in April 1920, and was transferred to Rosyth on 1 May 1920 to serve as a harbour depot ship. Crescent paid off and was placed on the disposal list on 17 September 1921. She was sold for scrapping on 19 December 1922.
