= HMS Vivid =

Five ships, one submarine and six shore establishments of the Royal Navy have borne the name HMS Vivid:

== Ships ==
- HMS Vivid (1848) was a wood paddle packet launched in 1848 and sold in 1894.
- HMS Vivid (1891) was an iron screw yacht purchased from civilian service in 1891, where she had been named Capercailzie. She became the Devonport base ship in 1892 and was sold in 1912, later being wrecked in 1913.
- HMS Vivid (P77) was a V-class submarine launched in 1943 and broken up in 1950.

== Shore establishments ==
- HMS Vivid (shore establishment 1890) was the Navy barracks at Devonport. It was commissioned in 1890, and operated as a training unit until 1914. The base was renamed HMS Drake in 1934. A number of ships were renamed HMS Vivid whilst serving as depot ships for the base:
  - HMS Vivid (1891) was the original depot ship between 1892 and 1912.
  - HMS Cuckoo (1873) was HMS Vivid between 1912 and 1920, HMS Vivid (Old) between 1920 and 1923, and YC37 from 1923 until 1958.
  - HMS Sabine (formerly HMS Sabrina (1876)) was HMS Vivid between 1919 and 1922.
  - HMS Harlech (formerly HMS Cambrian (1893)) was HMS Vivid between 1921 and 1923.
  - HMS Marshal Ney was HMS Vivid between 1922 and 1934.
- HMS Vivid (shore establishment) is the Plymouth base of the Royal Naval Reserve, commissioned in 1957 and currently in service.
