= Philip Francis Tillard =

Royal Navy Admiral (1852–1933)

Admiral Philip Francis Tillard (17 September 1852 – 23 February 1933) was a Royal Navy officer.

== Naval career ==
Tillard joined the Royal Navy.

By then a captain, Tillard was on 1 December 1902 appointed in command of the battleship HMS Canopus serving on the Mediterranean Station. Canopus ended her Mediterranean service in April the following year, and he paid her off into the Reserve at Portsmouth on 25 April 1903.
