= Harry Seawell Niblett =

Royal Navy Admiral (1852–1939)

Admiral Harry Seawell Niblett CVO
- Born: 31 October 1852
- Died: 26 December 1939 (aged 87)
- Military career
- Allegiance: United Kingdom
- Branch: Royal Navy
- Rank: Admiral
- Commands: HMS Diadem; HMS Canopus; Royal Naval Barracks, Devonport; Devonport Reserve division
- Awards: Commander of the Royal Victorian Order

Harry Seawell Frank Niblett, CVO (31 October 1852 – 26 December 1939) was a Royal Navy officer before the First World War.

Niblett entered the Royal Navy, was promoted to lieutenant on 31 March 1874, and to commander on 1 January 1887.

He served with the Mediterranean Fleet, and was promoted to captain on 30 June 1892. The following years he served as captain in command of HMS Northampton, HMS Edgar, HMS Diadem and HMS Canopus.

In December 1902 he was appointed commodore-in-command of the Royal Naval Barracks, Devonport, and captain of HMS Vivid, flagship and yacht to the port admiral.

Three years later he was promoted to rear-admiral on 1 January 1905, and in late 1906 he was appointed in command of the Devonport Reserve division.

He was appointed a Commander of the Royal Victorian Order (CVO) in August 1907, on the occasion of the Inspection by King Edward VII of the Home Fleet.

He retired from the navy in 1910, and was promoted to admiral on the Retired list on 20 March 1913.
