= HMS Canopus (1897) =

Pre-dreadnought battleship of the British Royal Navy

- Canopus, c. 1901

History

United Kingdom
- Name: HMS Canopus
- Namesake: Canopus, Egypt
- Ordered: 1896 Programme
- Builder: Portsmouth Dockyard
- Laid down: 4 January 1897
- Launched: 12 October 1897
- Completed: 5 December 1899
- Commissioned: 5 December 1899
- Decommissioned: April 1919
- Fate: Sold for scrapping 18 February 1920

General characteristics
- Class & type: Canopus-class pre-dreadnought battleship
- Displacement: Full load: 14,300 long tons (14,500 t)
- Length: 421 ft 6 in (128.5 m) (loa)
- Beam: 74 ft (22.6 m)
- Draught: 26 ft (7.9 m)
- Installed power: 20 × water tube boilers; 13,500 ihp (10,100 kW)
- Propulsion: 2 × screw propellers; 2 × triple-expansion steam engines
- Speed: 18 knots (33 km/h)
- Complement: 750
- Armament: 4 × BL 12 in (305 mm) 35-caliber Mk VIII guns; 12 × QF 6 in (152 mm) 40-caliber guns; 10 × 12-pounder 76 mm (3 in) quick-firing guns; 6 × 3-pounder guns; 4 × 18 in (457 mm) torpedo tubes
- Armour: Belt: 6 in; Bulkheads: 6–10 in (152–254 mm); Barbettes: 12 in; Gun turrets: 8 in (203 mm); Casemates: 5 in (127 mm); Conning tower: 12 in; Deck: 1–2 in (25–51 mm)

HMS Canopus was a pre-dreadnought battleship of the British Royal Navy and the lead ship of the Canopus class. Intended for service in Asia, Canopus and her sister ships were smaller and faster than the preceding Majestic-class battleships, but retained the same battery of four 12-inch (305 mm) guns. She also carried thinner armour, but incorporated new Krupp steel, which was more effective than the Harvey armour used in the Majestics. Canopus was laid down in January 1897, launched in October that year, and commissioned into the fleet in December 1899.

Canopus served in the Mediterranean Fleet upon commissioning until 1903, when she was decommissioned for refitting. In 1905, she was sent to East Asia, but the renewal of the Anglo-Japanese Alliance that year rendered her presence in Asian waters unnecessary. She instead returned to Britain and served with several fleet commands in British waters, including the Atlantic Fleet, the Channel Fleet, and finally the Home Fleet. Another short deployment to the Mediterranean followed in 1908–1909. Upon returning to Britain, she was placed in reserve.

At the beginning of the First World War in August 1914, she was mobilised for service in the South America Station, where she patrolled for German commerce raiders. She was involved in the search for the German East Asia Squadron of Vice Admiral Maximilian von Spee. Too slow to follow Admiral Sir Christopher Cradock's cruisers, she missed the Battle of Coronel in November 1914, where Cradock was defeated. Moored at Port Stanley as a defensive battery, she fired the first shots of the Battle of the Falklands in December, which led Spee to break off the attack before being chased down and destroyed by Admiral Doveton Sturdee's battlecruisers.

Canopus was transferred to the Mediterranean in early 1915 for the Dardanelles Campaign. She participated in major attacks on the Ottoman coastal fortifications defending the Dardanelles in March 1915, but the British and French fleets proved incapable of forcing the straits. After the Gallipoli Campaign ended with the withdrawal of Allied forces in January 1916, Canopus patrolled the eastern Mediterranean, but saw no further action. She was removed from service in April 1916 and was converted into a barracks ship in early 1918. After the war, the ship was broken up in 1920.

== Design ==
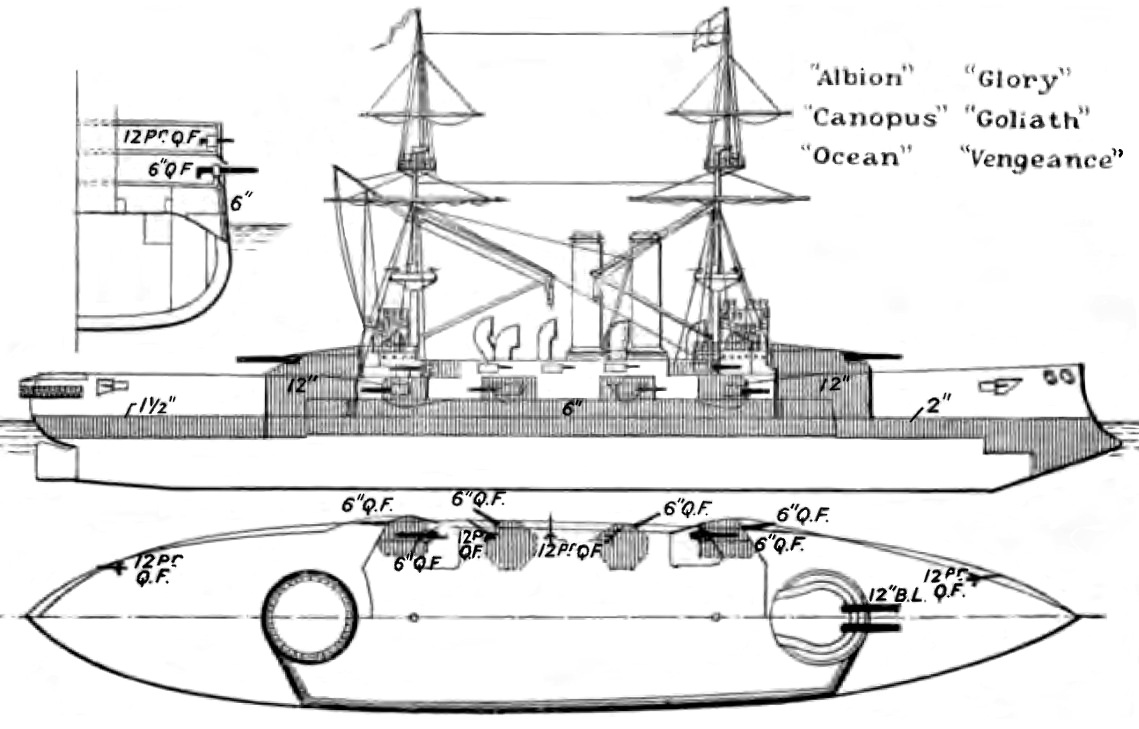
Right elevation, deck plan and hull section as depicted in Brassey's Naval Annual 1906

Canopus and her five sister ships were designed for service in East Asia, where the new rising power Japan was beginning to build a powerful navy, though this role was quickly made redundant by the Anglo-Japanese Alliance of 1902. The ships were designed to be smaller, lighter and faster than their predecessors, the Majestic-class battleships. Canopus was 421 feet 6 inches (128.47 m) long overall, with a beam of 74 ft (23 m) and a draft of 26 ft 2 in (7.98 m). She displaced 13,150 long tons (13,360 t) normally and up to 14,300 long tons (14,500 t) fully loaded. Her crew numbered 682 officers and ratings.

The Canopus-class ships were powered by a pair of 3-cylinder triple-expansion engines, with steam provided by twenty Belleville boilers. They were the first British battleships with water-tube boilers, which generated more power at less expense in weight compared with the fire-tube boilers used in previous ships. The new boilers led to the adoption of fore-and-aft funnels, rather than the side-by-side funnel arrangement used in many previous British battleships. The Canopus-class ships proved to be good steamers, with a high speed for battleships of their time—18 knots (33 km/h; 21 mph) from 13,500 indicated horsepower (10,100 kW)—a full two knots faster than the Majestics.

Canopus had a main battery of four 12-inch (305 mm) 35-calibre guns mounted in twin-gun turrets fore and aft; these guns were mounted in circular barbettes that allowed all-around loading, although at a fixed elevation. The ships also mounted a secondary battery of twelve 6-inch (152 mm) 40-calibre guns mounted in casemates, in addition to ten 12-pounder guns and six 3-pounder guns for defence against torpedo boats. As was customary for battleships of the period, she was also equipped with four 18-inch (457 mm) torpedo tubes submerged in the hull, two on each broadside near the forward and aft barbette.

To save weight, Canopus carried less armour than the Majestics—6 inches (152 mm) in the belt compared to 9 in (229 mm)—although the change from Harvey armour in the Majestics to Krupp armour in Canopus meant that the loss in protection was not as great as it might have been, Krupp armour having greater protective value at a given weight than its Harvey equivalent. Similarly, the other armour used to protect the ship could also be thinner; the bulkheads on either end of the belt were 6 to 10 in (152 to 254 mm) thick. The main battery turrets were 10 in thick, atop 12 in (305 mm) barbettes, and the casemate battery was protected with 5 in (127 mm) of Krupp steel. Her conning tower had 12 in thick sides as well. She was fitted with two armoured decks, 1 and 2 in (25 and 51 mm) thick, respectively.

== Service history ==
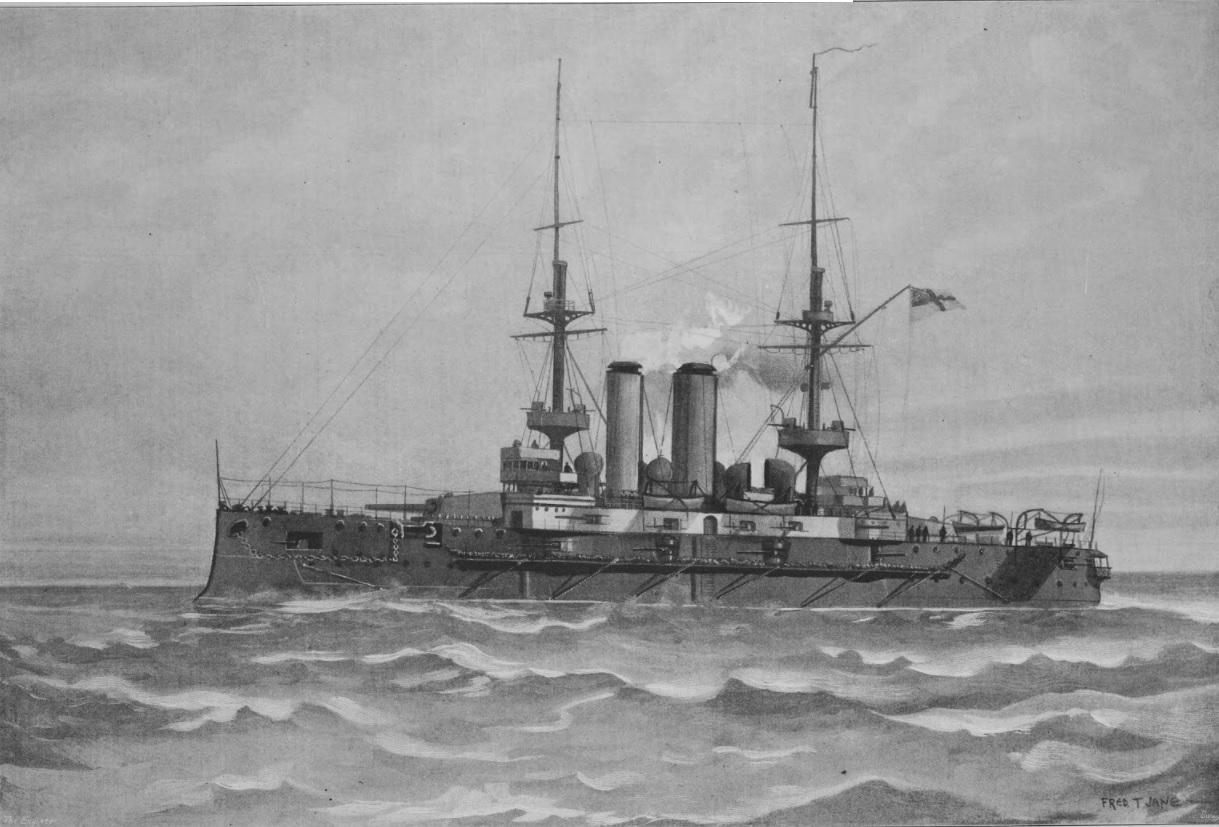
Illustration of Canopus in 1900, by Fred T. Jane

Canopus's keel was laid down at Portsmouth Dockyard on 4 January 1897. The ship was launched on 12 October 1897, and completed on 5 December 1899. She was named after the ancient city of Canopus, Egypt, where the Battle of the Nile took place. Canopus was commissioned at Portsmouth on 5 December 1899 for service in the Mediterranean Fleet. When docking at the Italian city La Spezia in April 1900, she was visited by the German Empress Frederick. Captain Harry Seawell Niblett was appointed in command in November 1900, and she underwent a refit at Malta from December 1900 to June 1901. In May 1902 she visited Palermo to attend festivities in connection with the opening of an Agricultural Exhibition by King Victor Emmanuel, and the following month saw her visiting Larnaka. Captain Philip Francis Tillard was appointed in command on 1 December 1902, and in January 1903 she carried the British Secretary of State for War, St John Brodrick, during a visit to Malta and Gibraltar. She ended her Mediterranean service in April that year, and paid off into the Reserve at Portsmouth on 25 April 1903. While in reserve, Canopus was given an extensive refit by Cammell Laird at Birkenhead that lasted from May 1903 to June 1904. Returning to the commissioned Reserve at Portsmouth, she was rammed by the battleship HMS Barfleur in Mount's Bay during manoeuvres on 5 August 1904, suffering slight damage.

Canopus returned to full commission on 9 May 1905 and relieved the battleship HMS Centurion on the China Station. She had reached Colombo, Ceylon on her outbound voyage when the United Kingdom and Japan ratified a treaty of alliance. The alliance meant that the United Kingdom could have a reduced presence on the China Station and battleships were no longer required there, so Canopus was recalled from Colombo in June 1905 and thus was the only Canopus-class battleship which did not serve on the China Station. Upon her return to the United Kingdom, Canopus began service in the Atlantic Fleet on 22 July 1905. In January 1906 she transferred to the Channel Fleet and later that year was fitted with fire control. On 10 March 1907, she transferred to the Portsmouth Division of the Home Fleet at Portsmouth, where she was reduced to a nucleus crew in May 1907 and underwent a refit between November 1907 and April 1908. Her refit completed, Canopus commissioned on 28 April 1908 for service in the Mediterranean Fleet. In December 1909, she was reduced to service in the 4th Division, Home Fleet, undergoing a refit at Chatham Dockyard from July 1911 to April 1912 during this service. In May 1912 she went into reserve at the Nore to serve as the parent ship for the 4th Division, Home Fleet. In 1913 and 1914 she was stationed at Pembroke Dock in Wales as part of the 3rd Fleet. The ships of the 3rd Fleet, though on the active list, were effectively in reserve, as they had small caretaker crews that would be completed only in the event of war.

=== First World War ===
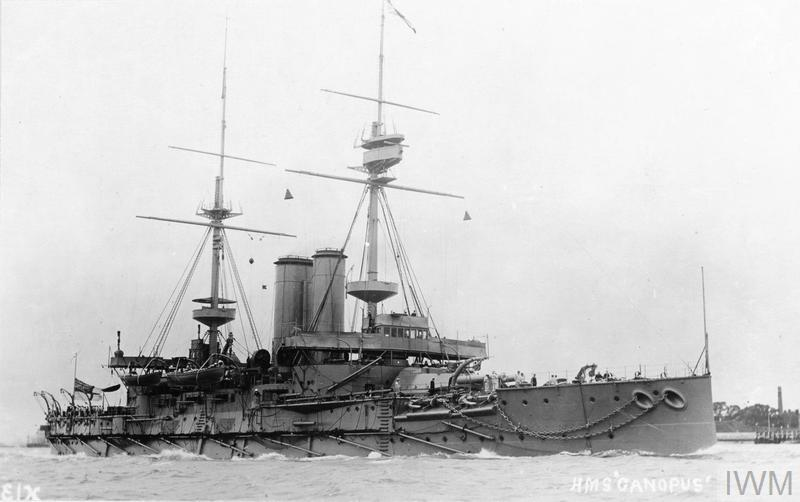
Canopus in WW1

After the First World War broke out in August 1914, Canopus was commissioned on 7 August 1914, for service in the 8th Battle Squadron in the Channel Fleet, under the command of Captain Heathcoat Grant. She was detached from that duty on 21 August 1914 to operate from the Cape Verde-Canary Islands Station to support the cruiser squadron there. In early September, her sister ship HMS Albion relieved her and Canopus transferred to the South America Station to become guard ship there and provide support to the cruiser squadron of Rear Admiral Christopher Cradock. While en route, Canopus nearly encountered the German light cruiser Karlsruhe off Brazil, but the German ship intercepted British radio signals before Canopus could locate her.

==== South Seas Station ====
Sketch of Canopus at Stanley

Canopus departed the Abrolhos Rocks on 8 October 1914 to assist Cradock's ships in searching for the German East Asia Squadron of Vice Admiral Maximilian von Spee, which was en route to the South Atlantic from the Far East. Canopus arrived at Stanley in the Falkland Islands on 18 October 1914, where she took up guard ship and escort duties. Cradock had initially intended to take Canopus with his squadron, which consisted of the armoured cruisers Good Hope and Monmouth, the light cruiser Glasgow and the auxiliary cruiser Otranto, but her late arrival, coupled with the fact that she required an overhaul upon arriving in the Falklands, forced Cradock to proceed without her. In addition, Canopus could make no more than 12 knots (22 km/h), which would have made it difficult for Cradock to force the East Asia Squadron into battle. Cradock ordered Canopus to join him when possible, though he intended to use her only to protect his colliers. On 27 October, Cradock detached his light cruiser Glasgow to Coronel to gather intelligence, and the next day ordered Canopus to bring the colliers to the Juan Fernández Islands, where his squadron would replenish its fuel. Glasgow arrived in Coronel on 31 October, but departed too early on 1 November to receive an order from the First Sea Lord that Cradock should not risk engaging Spee's squadron without Canopus.

Canopus was still some 300 nautical miles (560 km) south of Cradock when he encountered Spee's squadron, and the German ships were faster than the British cruisers, preventing Cradock from rejoining Canopus. In the ensuing Battle of Coronel, the East Asia Squadron sank both of Cradock's armoured cruisers and damaged Glasgow; by the time Cradock was defeated, Canopus was still 250 nautical miles (460 km) away. Glasgow and Otranto escaped to the south and rendezvoused with Canopus. Spee broke off the pursuit of the fleeing British ships when he became aware that Canopus was in the area, writing the following day that, "against this ship, we can hardly do anything. If they had kept their forces together we should most likely have come off second best." Shortly after news of the battle reached Britain, the Royal Navy ordered all naval forces in the region to consolidate; this included the remnants of Cradock's command, along with the armoured cruisers Defence, Carnarvon, and Cornwall. In addition, a pair of battlecruisers—Invincible and Inflexible—were detached from the Grand Fleet to hunt down and destroy Spee's squadron.

Illustration of Canopus firing on Spee's squadron

Canopus and Glasgow returned to Stanley, arriving there on 8 November 1914; they immediately proceeded to join the British warships concentrating off the River Plate. Canopus was ordered to return to the Falklands and place herself in Stanley to guard the port on 9 November. She arrived three days later, and began to make preparations for the defence of the harbour. At Stanley, Canopus's crew set up defences against an attack by Graf Spee. Canopus herself was beached in the mudflats in a position that allowed her to cover the entrance to the harbour and have a field of fire landward to the southeast; to reduce her visibility, her topmasts were struck and she was camouflaged. An observation post was established ashore on high ground and connected to the ship by telephone, allowing Canopus to use indirect fire against approaching ships. Some of her 12-pounder guns and a detachment of seventy Royal Marines were put ashore to defend Stanley and its environs. On 25 November, Canopus intercepted a radio message that indicated that Spee's squadron had rounded Cape Horn, though the message was erroneous; Spee actually made the passage on the night of 1–2 December. By 4 December, Canopus's crew had completed their preparations.

On 7 December, the main British squadron, commanded by Vice Admiral Doveton Sturdee, arrived in Stanley and began coaling, with the intention of departing two days later to search for Spee. Instead, on the morning of 8 December, the German squadron arrived off Stanley; at 07:50, lookouts aboard Canopus raised the alarm. Shortly after 09:00, by which time the German cruisers—Gneisenau and Nürnberg—had approached to within 11,000 yards (10,000 m) , Canopus fired two salvos, both of which fell short. Observers stated that fragments from the second salvo hit one of Gneisenau's funnels, though according to modern historians, including Robert Gardiner and Randal Gray, Hew Strachan, and Paul Halpern, Canopus made no hits with either salvo. Under fire from Canopus and spotting the tripod masts of Sturdee's battlecruisers, Spee called off his force's planned attack on the Falklands. At 09:31, Canopus ceased firing, as the Germans had begun to withdraw. Sturdee's battlecruisers, much faster than Spee's ships, eventually caught and destroyed the East Asia Squadron, with the exception of the light cruiser SMS Dresden, which was able to outrun the British pursuers. Canopus, still moored in the mud, remained behind at Stanley and missed the rest of the battle. Canopus left the Falklands on 18 December 1914 to return to her South American Station duties at the Abrolhos Rocks.

==== Dardanelles campaign ====
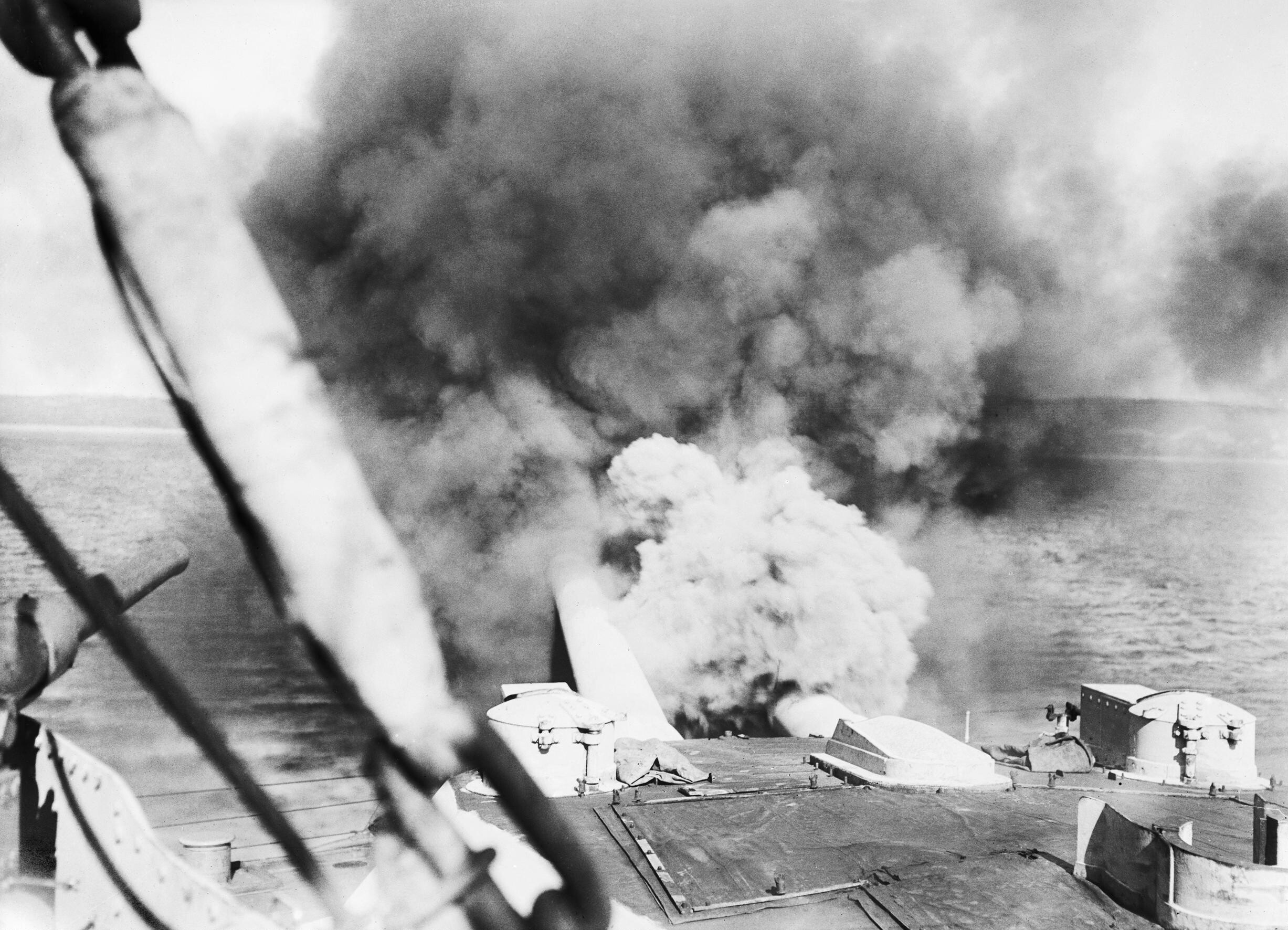
Canopus' 12-inch (305 mm) guns fire on Turkish defences in the Dardanelles, March 1915. Photo by Ernest Brooks.

In February 1915, Canopus transferred to the Mediterranean to take part in the Dardanelles campaign. On 2 March 1915, she took part in the second attack on the Ottoman Turkish entrance forts at the Dardanelles. During this operation, she led the 4th Sub-Division, which also included the pre-dreadnoughts Cornwallis and Swiftsure. Canopus and Swiftsure were tasked with suppressing the guns in the fortress at Dardanus while Cornwallis would engage minor batteries at Intepe and Erenköy. Canopus and Swiftsure entered the straits at 13:20 and closed to within 1,000 yards (910 m) of the north shore, where at 14:20 they opened fire at the fortress on the other side of the straits, some 7,500 yards (6,900 m) away. The ships fired for about two hours before the Ottomans inside Dardanus returned fire at 16:15, which they did quite accurately, straddling Canopus quickly and scoring a hit on her quarterdeck that damaged a wardroom. A second shell knocked down her topmast and a third holed her after funnel, exploded, and rained fragments on two of her boats.

The heavy Ottoman fire forced Canopus and Swiftsure to withdraw from their bombardment position, though this placed them in range of the guns at Erenköy as well, while those at Dardanus could still engage them. Cornwallis, having silenced the guns at Intepe, started shelling Erenköy, while Canopus and Swiftsure kept their fire on Dardanus. The Ottomans repeatedly straddled the three battleships, but being further out in the strait, they had more room to manoeuvre and so avoided any direct hits. By 16:40, the guns at Dardanus fell silent, allowing all three ships to concentrate their fire at Erenköy, where the batteries were quickly neutralised. The three ships then withdrew, seemingly having achieved their objective, though that night, when destroyers and minesweepers tried to clear the minefields blocking the straits, they were met with very heavy fire and were forced to withdraw. During the third landings on 4 March 1915, she demonstrated off the Aegean coast to keep Ottoman ground forces tied down.

She covered the bombardment of the forts by the superdreadnought HMS Queen Elizabeth on 8 March, and covered minesweepers attempting to sweep in minefields off Kephes on 10 March. During the operation on the 10th, she, the protected cruiser Amethyst, and several destroyers covered a force of minesweepers. Canopus attempted to destroy the searchlights for the Ottoman coastal guns but failed to knock them out. As a result, when the minesweepers tried to clear the mines, they came under intense fire and had to retreat, one of them striking a mine in the chaos. She also took part in the major attack on the Narrows forts on 18 March 1915. During the 18 March attack, a fleet of British and French warships—including Queen Elizabeth and the battlecruiser Inflexible—would attempt to suppress the forts in daylight, allowing the minesweepers to finally clear the fields unmolested by Ottoman fire. The British ships initially succeeded in inflicting heavy damage on the fortresses, but the battleship Agamemnon and then Inflexible began taking serious damage from the coastal batteries. The French battleships also began to take damage, and the battleship Bouvet struck a mine and exploded.

The French ships began to retreat, but Canopus and the other British battleships continued the bombardment. Shortly thereafter, Inflexible struck a mine and was badly damaged but managed to withdraw. The battleships Irresistible and Ocean also struck mines and both sank, forcing the British to break off the attack. After that attack, Canopus and protected cruiser HMS Talbot escorted the damaged Inflexible from Mudros to Malta on 6 April. In heavy weather and with Inflexible nearly foundering, Canopus had to take the crippled battlecruiser under tow, stern first, during the last six hours of the voyage on 10 April. Returning to the Dardanelles, Canopus took part in the blockade of Smyrna and covered a diversionary attack on Bulair during the main landings on 25 April 1915. She supported Anzac forces ashore in May, including during a strong Ottoman counterattack on 19 May. When her sister ship Albion became stranded on a sandbank off Gaba Tepe under heavy fire on 22–23 May 1915, Canopus towed her free. On 25 May, Canopus withdrew to Mudros and while leaving the Dardanelles, encountered the German U-boat SM U-21, which went on to sink the battleship Triumph later that day. Canopus then underwent a refit at Malta from May to June 1915.

==== Fate ====
After the Dardanelles campaign ended with the evacuation of Allied forces from Gallipoli in January 1916, Canopus was assigned to the British Eastern Mediterranean Squadron, where she served until she returned to the United Kingdom in April 1916. Canopus arrived at Plymouth on 22 April 1916, then paid off at Chatham to provide crews for antisubmarine vessels. She remained at Chatham until April 1916, undergoing a refit there later in 1916, having her eight main-deck 6-inch (152 mm) guns replaced by four on the battery deck and her 12-pounder and 3-pounder guns replaced by light antiaircraft weapons in 1917, and becoming an accommodation ship in February 1918. Canopus was placed on the disposal list at Chatham in April 1919. She was sold for scrapping on 18 February 1920 and arrived at Dover on 26 February 1920 to be scrapped.
