= British North Russia Squadron =

Squadron of the Royal Navy from 1917 to 1919

- Active: 1917–1919
- Country: United Kingdom
- Branch: Royal Navy

Commanders
- Notable commanders: Thomas Kemp

The British North Russia Squadron was a squadron of the Royal Navy based at Murmansk from 1917 to 1919.

== History ==
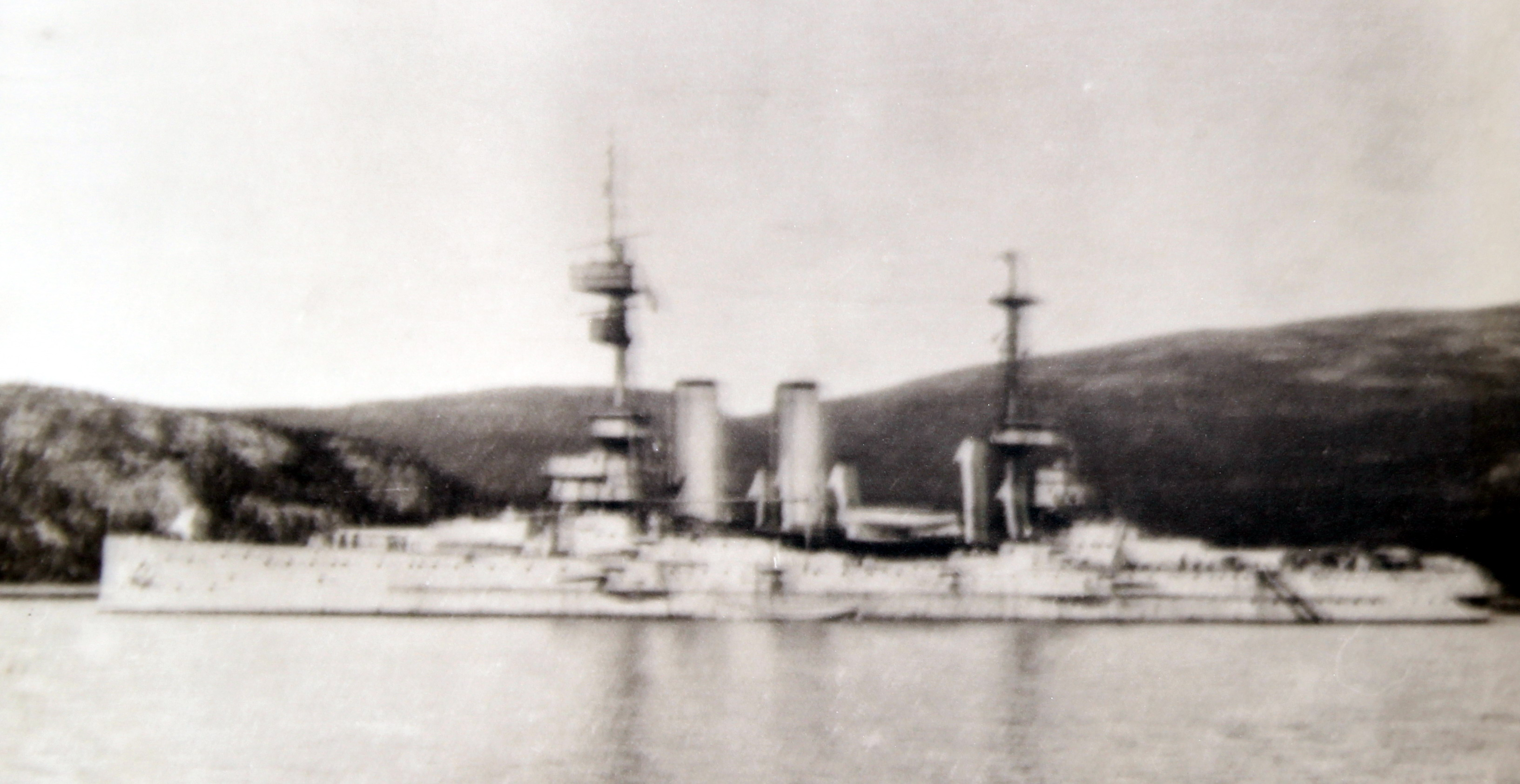
HMS Glory in Murmansk

The squadron was formed as part of an initiative by the Entente Powers to keep the Russian Empire in the First World War. One goal was to protect the large stockpiles of Allied material that had begun stockpiling at the ice-free port at Murmansk. Russia's continued involvement in the war was challenged externally by German advances into the East and internally by a strong antipathy to the war amongst the Russian population. This later factor had led to support for the Bolshevik Revolution and had resulted in the Russian Civil War. The squadron would remain in Russia throughout most of the Allied North Russia Intervention, though it served no real role in this.

The squadron was originally placed under the command of Rear Admiral Thomas Kemp with the Canopus-class predreadnought HMS Glory as his flagship. This battleship had been refitted, with some guns being removed to allow for more accommodation for marines. There was also the cruiser HMS Vindictive (1897), a depot ship, an armed boarding vessel and a variety of trawlers and drifters which had been converted to function as minesweepers.

In October 1918 Rear-Admiral John F.E. Green became senior British naval officer in northern Russia, relieving Admiral Kemp, who returned home. Rear-Admiral Green did not object to the withdrawal of American ships from Murmansk after July 1918, as the U.S. naval ships had been logistically dependent on the British, to whom they had been a burden.

The squadron returned to England in September 1919, shortly after the ratification of peace with Germany, with the signing of the Treaty of Versailles.

== Admiral commanding ==
Post holders included:

	Rank	Name	Appointment	Term	Notes
1	Rear-Admiral	Thomas W. Kemp	Rear-Admiral-in-Charge, Murmansk	Flagship HMS Glory (1899)	
2	Rear-Admiral	John Green	Rear-Admiral Commanding, White Sea	30 Oct or 15 Nov 1918 onwards	Flagship "Glory"
3	Commodore	Richard Hyde	Senior Naval Officer, White Sea / Archangel	8 August 1918 – 1 December 1919	
