= Canopus-class battleship =

Pre-dreadnought battleship class of the British Royal Navy

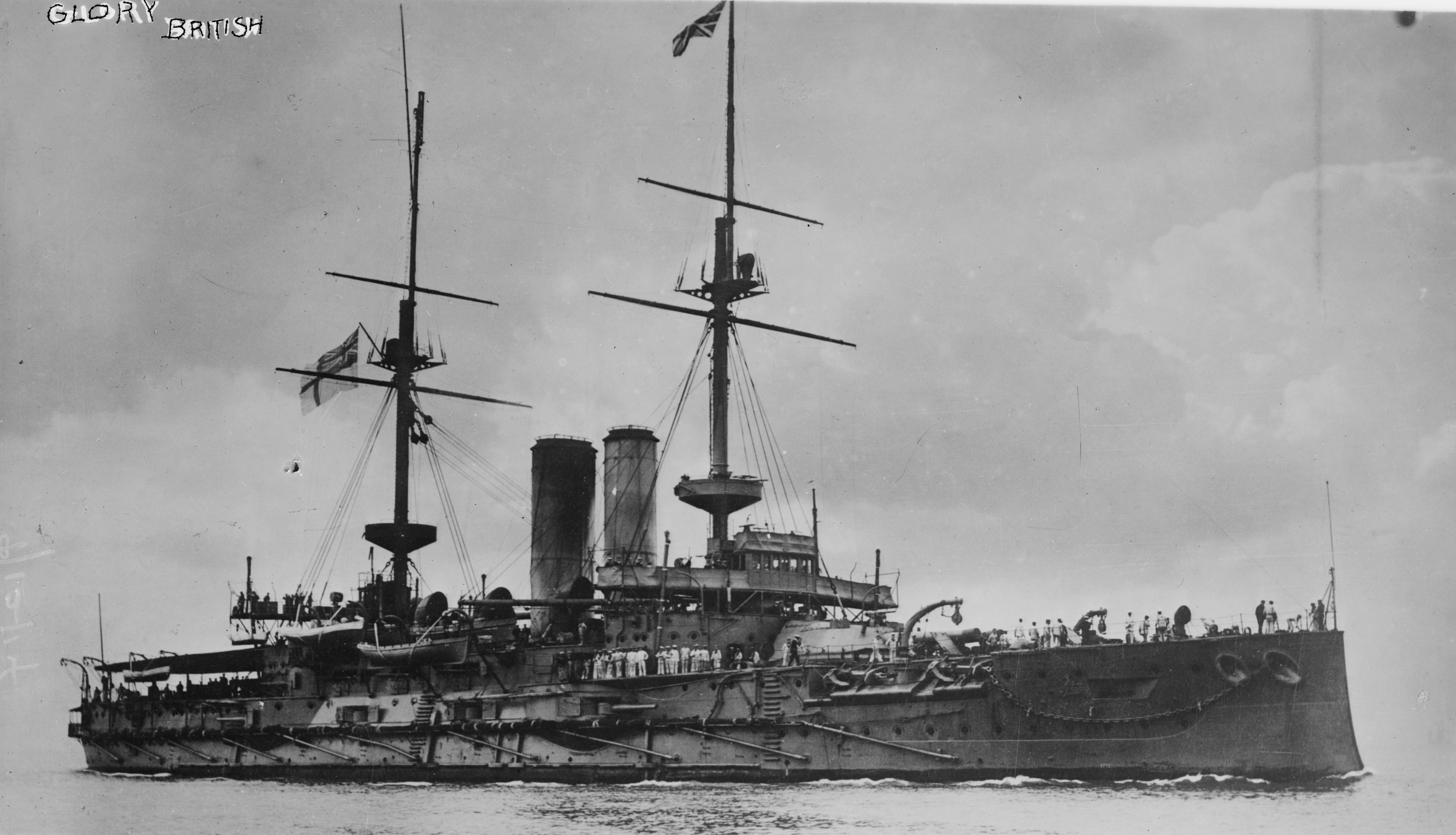
- HMS Glory

Class overview
- Name: Canopus-class battleship
- Builders: Chatham Dockyard; Devonport Dockyard; Laird Brothers; Portsmouth Dockyard; Thames Ironworks; Vickers, Sons & Maxim
- Operators: Royal Navy
- Preceded by: Majestic class
- Succeeded by: Formidable class
- Built: 1896–1902
- In commission: 1899–1919
- Completed: 6
- Lost: 2
- Retired: 4

General characteristics
- Type: Pre-dreadnought battleship
- Displacement: Full load: 14,300 long tons (14,500 t)
- Length: 421 ft 6 in (128.5 m) (loa)
- Beam: 74 ft (22.6 m)
- Draught: 26 ft (7.9 m)
- Installed power: 20 × water tube boilers; 13,500 ihp (10,100 kW)
- Propulsion: 2 × screw propellers; 2 × triple-expansion steam engines
- Speed: 18 knots (33 km/h)
- Complement: 682
- Armament: 2 × 2 BL 12 in (305 mm) 35-caliber Mk VIII guns; 12 × QF 6 in (152 mm) 40-caliber guns; 10 × 12-pounder 76 mm (3 in) quick-firing guns; 6 × 3-pounder guns; 4 × 18 in (457 mm) torpedo tubes
- Armour: Belt 6 in; Bulkheads: 6–10 in (152–254 mm); Barbettes: 12 in; Turrets: 8 in (203 mm); Casemates: 5 in (127 mm); Conning tower: 12 in; Decks: 1–2 in (25–51 mm)

The Canopus class was a group of six pre-dreadnought battleships of the British Royal Navy built in the late 1890s. The ships were designed by the Director of Naval Construction, William White, for use on the China Station. The class comprised Canopus, the lead ship, and Glory, Albion, Ocean, Goliath, and Vengeance. The class was armed with a main battery of four BL 12 inch Mk VIII naval guns and a secondary battery of twelve QF 6-inch guns. Compared to the preceding Majestic-class battleships, the Canopus class was smaller, faster, and less heavily armoured, though they adopted new, stronger Krupp armour, which was more effective than the Harvey steel used in the Majestics. In addition to the Krupp steel, the ships also adopted several other changes, including water-tube boilers, in-line funnels, and a full-length armoured belt.

The six ships of the Canopus class served abroad for much of their early careers, with all six of them seeing service on the China Station in the early 1900s. In addition, Canopus also served with the Mediterranean Fleet during this period. In 1905, with the signing of the Anglo-Japanese Alliance, the Royal Navy withdrew most of its heavy units from the Far East, and the six Canopus-class ships returned to British waters, seeing further service with the Home, Channel, and the Atlantic Fleets through 1908. From then to 1910, most of the ships saw service with the Mediterranean Fleet, before being reduced to reserve status or other secondary duties thereafter.

With Britain's entry into the First World War in August 1914, the ships were mobilised as the 8th Battle Squadron, but they were quickly dispersed to other stations, serving as guard ships and convoy escorts. Canopus participated in the hunt for the German East Asia Squadron, which culminated in the Battle of the Falkland Islands in December 1914. In early 1915, most of the ships were sent to the eastern Mediterranean Sea to take part in the Dardanelles Campaign against the Ottoman Empire. During these operations, Ocean and Goliath were sunk, in March and May 1915, respectively. Canopus and Albion were withdrawn from active service in 1916, thereafter being used as barracks ships. Glory served as the flagship of the British North Russia Squadron, while Vengeance took part in operations off German East Africa in 1916. After the war, all four survivors were quickly broken up in the early 1920s.

== Design ==
Design work began on what became the Canopus class in March 1895, when William Henry White, the Director of Naval Construction, presented the design for the Japanese Fuji-class battleships then being built in Britain to the Board of Admiralty. These ships, which were based on the British Royal Sovereign class, represented a marked increase in Japanese naval power in East Asia, and White argued that more powerful battleships would be required on the China Station to counter them. He also suggested that the new design be capable of transiting the Suez Canal to reduce transit time between Europe and Asia. The Board concurred, and on 13 May again met White to provide their requirements for the new ships. Two days later, White relayed the parameters for the ships to his staff, along with instructions to prepare a suitable design as quickly as possible. The new ships were to have a freeboard equal to that of the battleship HMS Centurion, the same main battery as the preceding Majestic-class battleships, a secondary battery of ten 6-inch (152 mm) guns, the speed and fuel capacity as the second-class battleship Renown, and an armoured belt that was 6 inches thick.

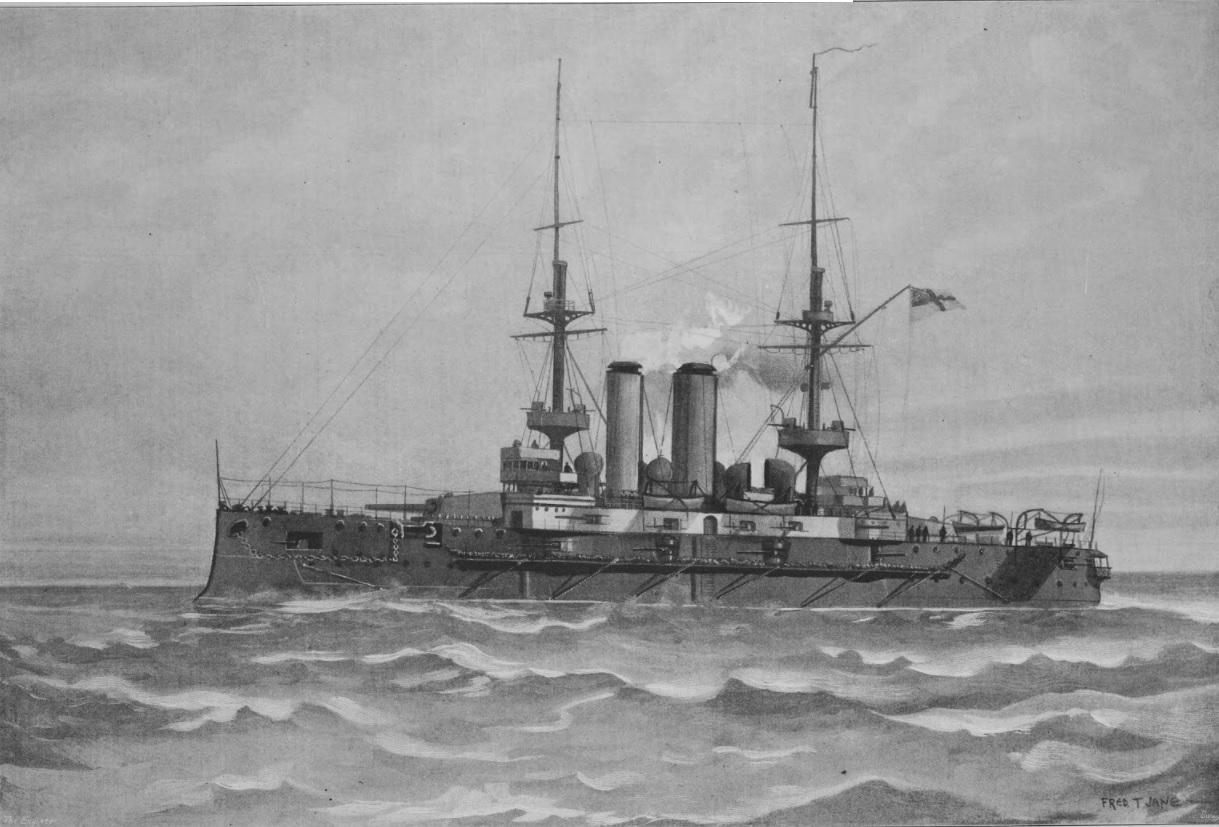
Illustration of Canopus in 1900, by Fred T. Jane

White and his staff prepared a preliminary design sketch on 23 May, which they submitted to the Admiralty. This vessel was to carry the specified battery of four 12-inch (305 mm) guns and ten 6-inch guns on a displacement of 13,250 long tons (13,460 t). Speed was to be 18 knots (33 km/h; 21 mph) from 12,500 indicated horsepower (9,300 kW). Further work to refine the design continued, and three variants were created: "A", "B", and "C". "A" reduced displacement slightly to 13,000 long tons (13,000 t), but kept the same armament and speed. "B" was broadly similar to the original design, but added two 6-inch guns, and "C" was slightly smaller, along the lines of "A", but its secondary battery consisted of eight 6-inch guns and eight 4-inch (102 mm) guns. The three variants were submitted to the Admiralty in early October; on the 9th, the Board sent its reply to White, instructing him to prepare a new design that combined the armour layout of "A" and "B" with the secondary battery of "B".

Design work continued for almost a year before the final version was approved on 2 September 1896. By this time, the Board had decided to adopt new water-tube boilers after they had been successfully tested aboard the torpedo gunboat Sharpshooter. The armour layout was further revised, with the final version discarding the thinner side armour above the belt, along with the aft strake of armour; the main and secondary guns also had their armour protection reduced. These reductions were used to increase the thickness of the forward strake and the main deck and to place four of the secondary guns in armoured casemates. Though the thickness of the armour layout was much reduced compared to the preceding Majestic class, the adoption of new Krupp steel in place of the Harvey steel allowed for only a modest decrease in protection.

Six vessels, rated as first-class battleships, were authorized to be built to the new design in the 1896 and 1897 estimates. Though the armour scheme was not as weak as it appeared on paper, the Royal Navy was not pleased with the reduction in defensive power. White's department regarded them as second-class battleships, and they were indeed classified as "improved Renowns" in the 1896 estimates. Nevertheless, they matched the Fujis they were intended to counter, and they represented the maximum offensive and defensive capabilities possible on the displacement and draught restrictions imposed by the Admiralty. They proved more than capable of performing the task for which they had been built on the China Station.

=== General characteristics ===
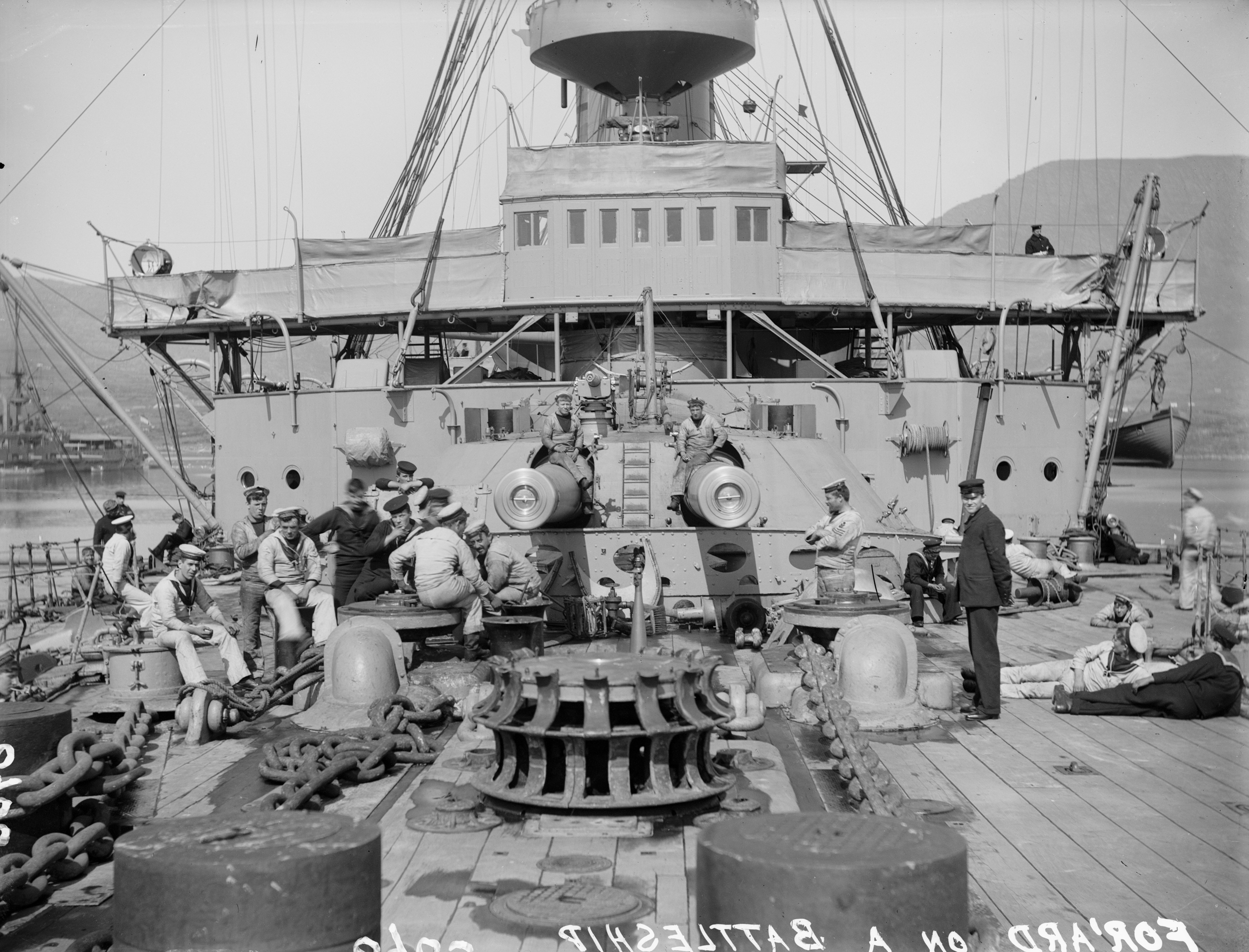
Crew on the forward deck of a Canopus-class battleship, c. 1905

The ships of the Canopus class were 390 feet 3.5 inches (118.961 m) long between perpendiculars and 421 ft 6 in (128.47 m) long overall, with a beam of 74 ft (23 m). They had a draft of 26 ft 2 in (7.98 m) normally and up to 30 feet (9.1 m) fully loaded. They displaced 13,150 long tons (13,360 t) normally and up to 14,300 long tons (14,500 t) at full load. The ships were fitted with two masts, each with one fighting top carrying several of the light guns and one searchlight. Four other searchlights were mounted on the bridges.

Their crew numbered 682 officers and ratings on completion, but the number varied throughout the ships' careers. For example, by 1904, Goliath's crew had increased to 737 and Albion had a crew of 752, which included an admiral's staff. While serving as a gunnery training ship in 1912, Vengeance had a crew of just 400, while Albion was reduced to 371 officers and sailors as a guard ship in 1916. Each ship carried a number of small boats, including two steam pinnaces and one sail pinnace, one steam launch, three cutters, one galley, one whaler, three gigs, two dinghies, and one raft.

=== Propulsion ===
The Canopus-class ships were powered by a pair of 3-cylinder triple-expansion engines that drove a pair of inward-turning screw propellers, with steam provided by twenty Belleville boilers. They were the first British battleships with water-tube boilers, which generated more power at less expense in weight compared with the fire-tube boilers used in previous ships. The new boilers led to the adoption of two fore-and-aft funnels, rather than the side-by-side funnel arrangement used in many previous British battleships. The Canopus-class ships proved to be good steamers, with a high speed for battleships of their time—18 knots (33 km/h; 21 mph) from 13,500 indicated horsepower (10,100 kW)—a full two knots faster than the Majestics. The increase in speed came primarily from the water-tube boilers, which produced an extra 1,500 ihp (1,100 kW) compared to the older fire-tube boilers of the Majestics. The inward-turning screws also provided an increase in speed, since they could be operated at higher revolutions than the outward-turning screws used in earlier ships.

Each ship had a fuel capacity of 900 long tons (910 t) of coal under normal conditions, but additional spaces could be used to double capacity, for 1,800 long tons (1,829 t) during wartime. The ships burned 52 long tons (53 t) of coal steaming at 8 knots (15 km/h; 9.2 mph) for 24 hours and up to 336 long tons (341 t) at full speed every 24 hours. The Canopuses were able to reach 5,320 mi (8,560 km) at an economical cruising speed of 10 kn (19 km/h; 12 mph) with a full load of coal. While steaming at 16.5 knots (30.6 km/h; 19.0 mph), the range fell significantly to 2,590 nmi (4,800 km; 2,980 mi).

Though the water-tube boilers significantly increased performance, they were plagued with problems throughout the ships' careers. Ocean's boiler condenser tubes leaked badly until a refit in 1902–1903 corrected the problem. Vengeance similarly suffered throughout her service life, which reduced the efficiency of her engines. The inward-turning screws also caused problems in service, as they made steering difficult at low speed or when steaming in reverse; the arrangement proved to be unpopular with crews as a result. Regardless, the Royal Navy retained inward-turning screws in all future pre-dreadnought battleships, before returning to outward-turning propellers for Dreadnought in 1906.

=== Armament ===
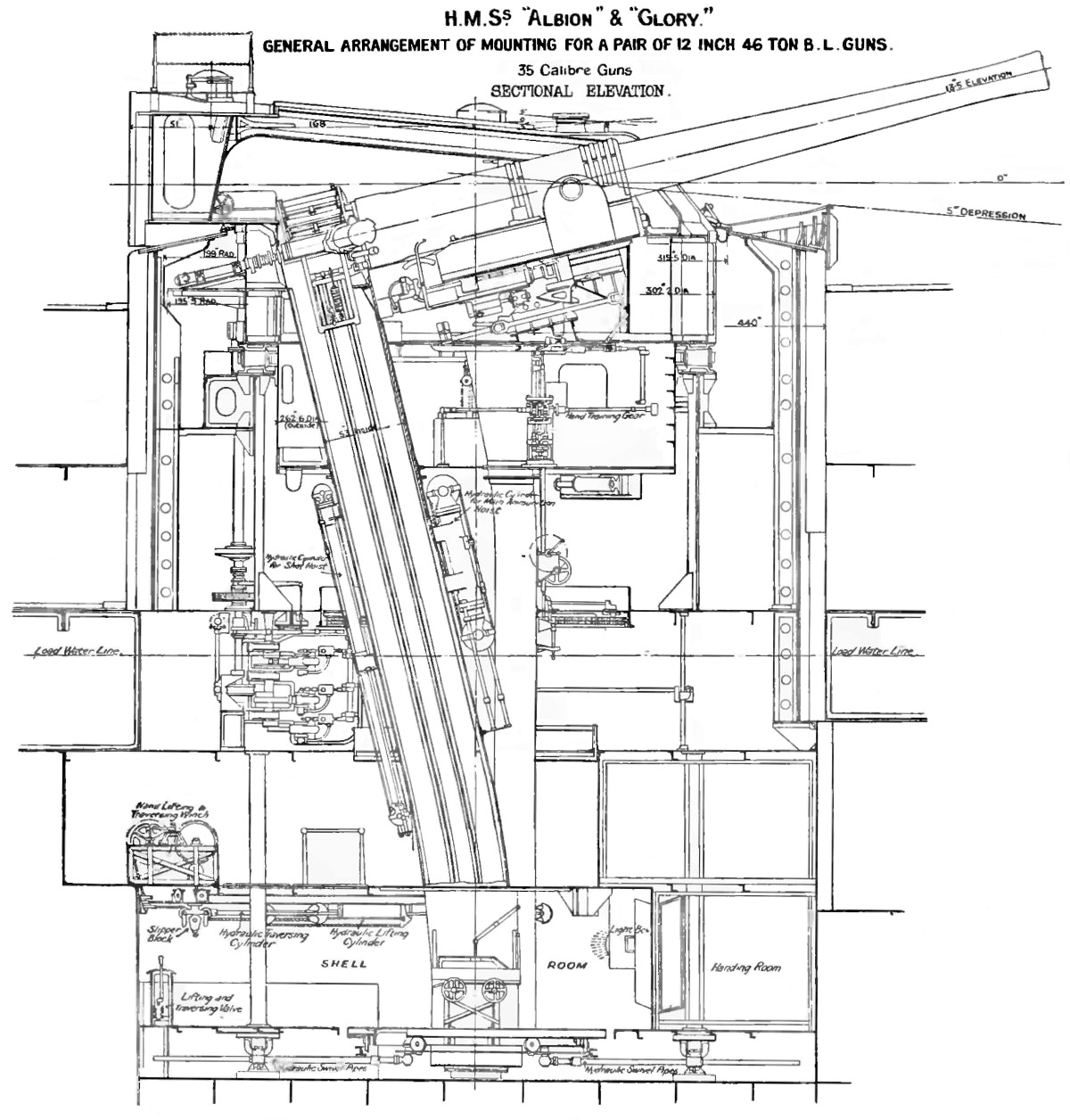
Right elevation of 12-inch gun turret and ammunition hoists in the BIV mounting

The ships of the Canopus class had four 12-inch 35-calibre guns mounted in twin-gun turrets fore and aft; these guns were mounted in circular barbettes that allowed all-around loading, although at a fixed elevation. Canopus carried her guns in BIII mountings, the same used in the last two Majestic-class ships, while the next four vessels used the newer BIV mounts, and Vengeance used newer-still BV mountings. The BIII mounts featured a deck that interrupted the shell and propellant hoists to prevent the flash fire from an explosion in the turret from easily reaching down to the magazines, which could produce a catastrophic explosion. The BIV mounts eliminated this deck to allow for faster ammunition handling, but the designers realized the greatly increased risk this entailed, and so restored the deck with the BV mounts. To improve shell handling speed, a new turret was developed by Vickers for Vengeance that allowed for reloading the guns at all elevations, which eliminated the need to return to the fixed loading elevation, improving her rate of fire significantly.

The ships also mounted a secondary battery of twelve 6-inch 40-calibre guns mounted in casemates. Eight of the 6-inch guns were mounted in the main deck, which placed them too low to give them a good field of fire, though the other four guns, mount a deck higher, did not suffer from the same problem. For close-range defence against torpedo boats, the ships carried a tertiary battery of ten 12-pounder guns and six 3-pounder guns in individual mounts, distributed along the length of the ships, including in casemates in the bow and stern and in pivot mounts in the superstructure.

As was customary for battleships of the period, they were also equipped with four 18-inch (457 mm) torpedo tubes submerged in the hull, two on each broadside near the forward and aft barbette. A fifth tube had been planned at the ship's stern, above the water, but it was eliminated during construction. This was likely done because the above-water tubes could not be adequately protected, and if a torpedo exploded while it was still in the tube, it could have done serious damage to the ship.

=== Armour ===
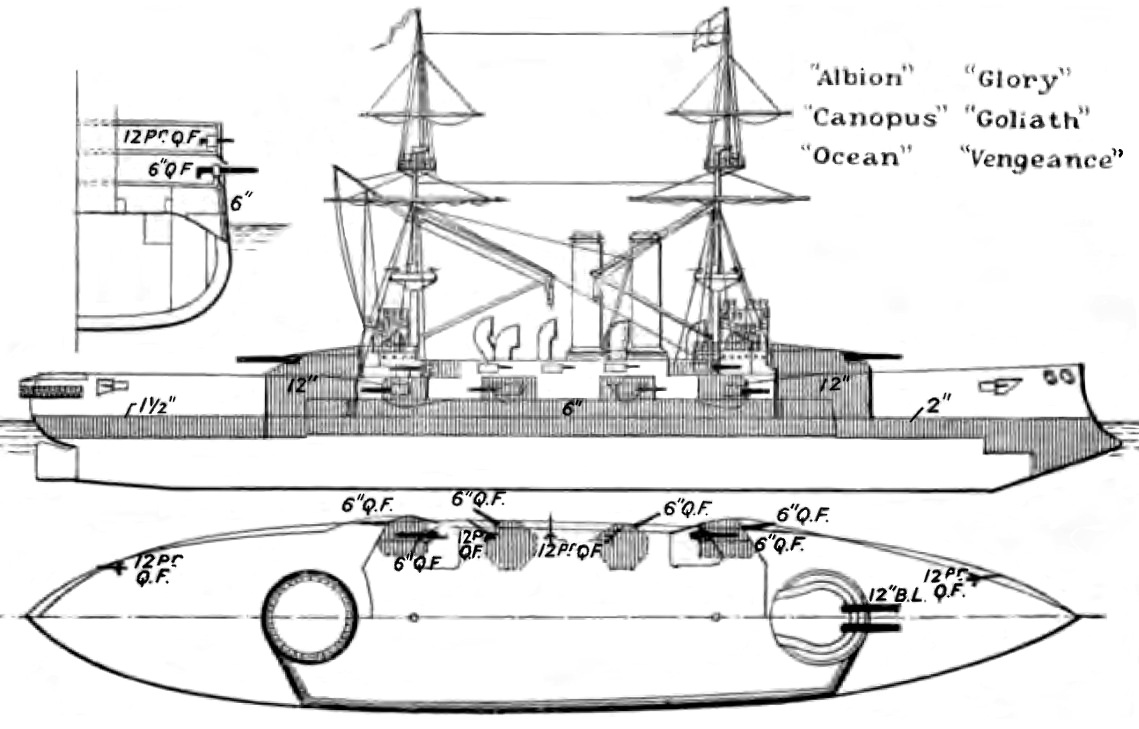
Line-drawing of the Canopus class, showing the arrangement of the armour layout

To save weight, Canopus carried less armour than the Majestics—6 inches in the belt compared to 9 in (229 mm)—although the change from Harvey armour in the Majestics to Krupp armour in Canopus meant that the loss in protection was not as great as it might have been, Krupp armour having 30 percent greater protective value at a given weight than its Harvey equivalent. Though it was thinner, it was more comprehensive; the Canopus class was the first British capital ship to return to a full-length armoured belt since Dreadnought, launched in 1875. To save weight, the belt was reduced to 2 inches (51 mm) at either end of the ship. As with the belt, the other armour used to protect the ships could also be thinner; the bulkheads on either end of the belt were 6 to 10 in (152 to 254 mm) thick.

They were fitted with two armoured decks, 1 and 2 in (25 and 51 mm) thick, respectively, both of which were Harvey steel. This was the first time a second armour deck was installed in a British warship. At the time the design was being prepared, rumours circulated that the French intended to equip their newest battleships with howitzers, which fired shells at high angles; this would allow them to hit British ships with plunging fire, avoiding the ships' heavy belt armour. The French did not place howitzers on any of their new ships, but the adoption of two armour decks was continued in British practice until the Nelson-class battleships of the 1920s.

The main battery turrets were 8 in (203 mm) thick with 2 in thick roofs, atop 10 to 12 in barbettes. The barbettes reduced to 6 in behind the belt. Not all sections of the ships received the Krupp steel; the casemate battery was protected with 5 in of Harvey steel on the fronts, and 2 in on the sides and the rears. Their forward conning towers received Harvey steel for their sides that were 12 in thick, while the aft conning towers had only 3 in (76 mm) sides.

The thinner armour layout of the ships came under intense criticism while they were being built, particularly in the press. White publicly defended the design, pointing out that recent experience between Chinese and Japanese warships at the Battle of the Yalu River demonstrated that armour proved to be more effective in protecting ships than proving ground tests would indicate, and the advances in armour technology warranted the reduction in service of saving weight for better weapons.

== Ships ==
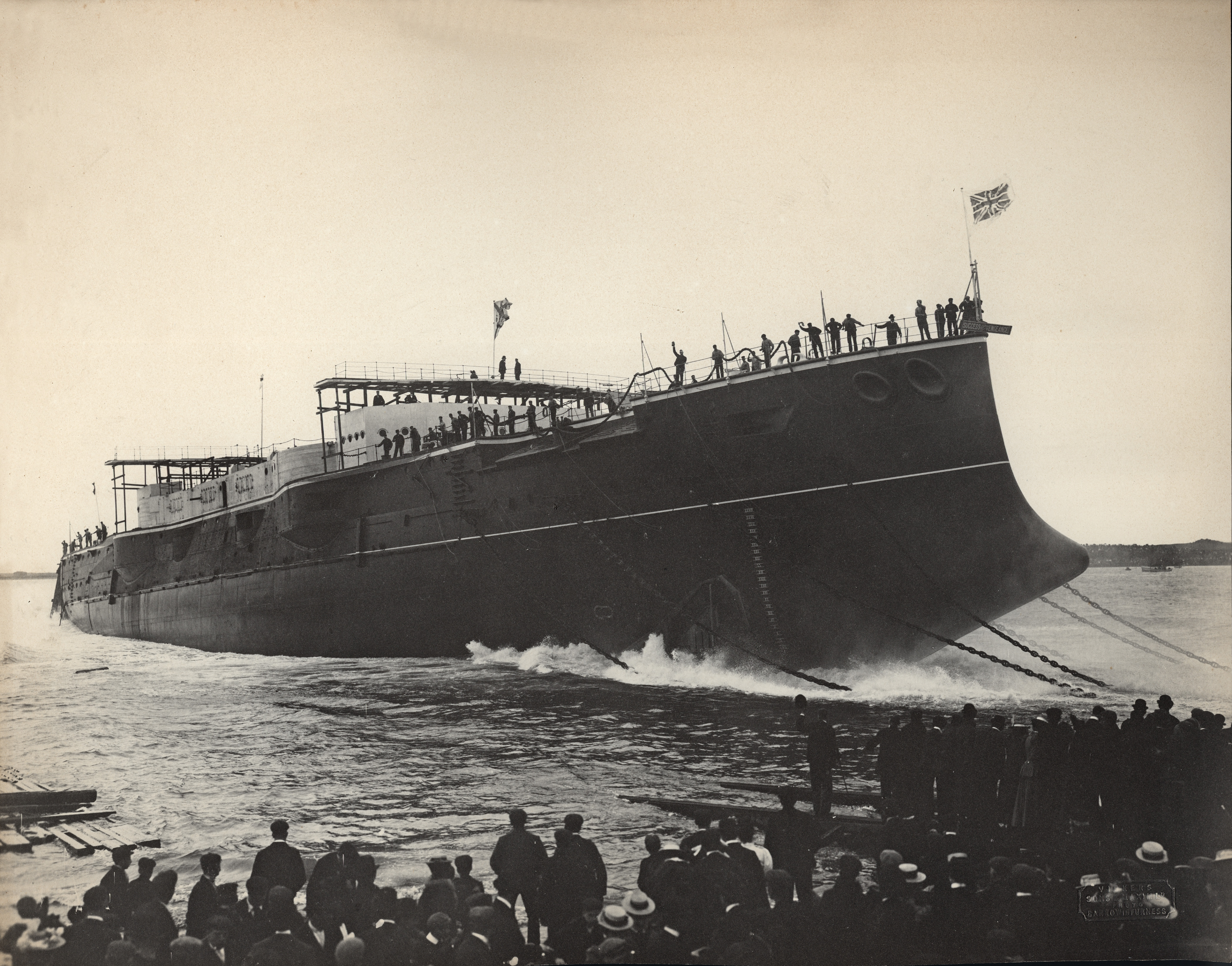
Launch of HMS Vengeance (1899)

Construction data
Ship	Builder	Laid down	Launched	Completed	Fate
Canopus	HM Dockyard, Portsmouth	4 January 1897	12 October 1897	5 December 1899	Broken up, 1920
Glory	Laird Brothers, Birkenhead	1 December 1896	11 March 1899	October 1900	Broken up, 1922
Albion	Thames Iron Works, London	3 December 1896	21 June 1898	June 1901	Broken up, 1919
Ocean	HM Dockyard, Devonport	15 December 1897	5 July 1898	February 1900	Struck mine and sank, 18 March 1915
Goliath	HM Dockyard, Chatham	4 January 1897	23 March 1898	March 1900	Torpedoed and sank, 15 May 1915
Vengeance	Vickers, Barrow	23 August 1898	25 July 1899	April 1902	Broken up, 1921

== Service history ==
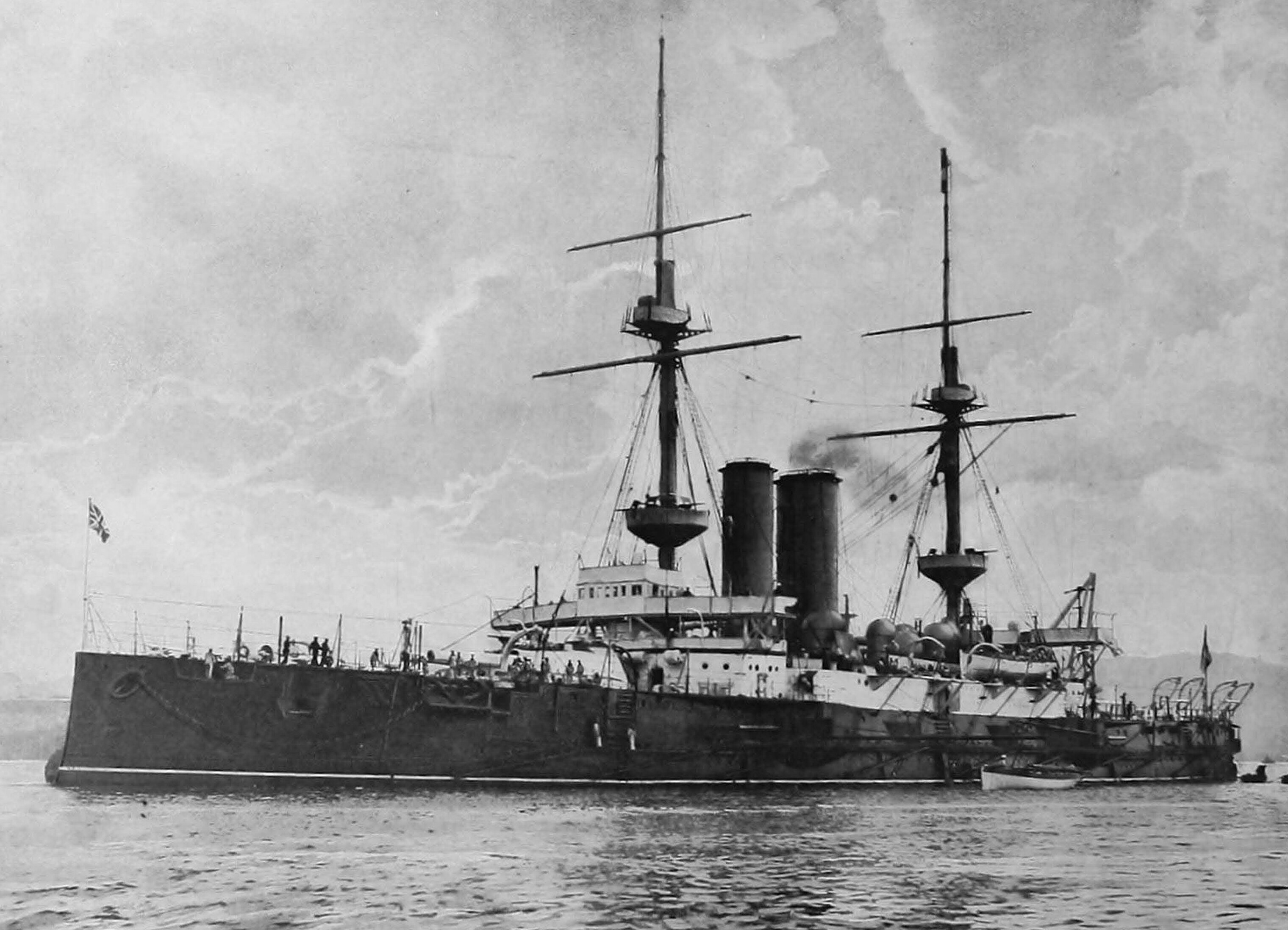
HMS Ocean, c. 1900

=== Pre-war ===
The ships of the class spent much of their peacetime career abroad. Canopus spent her early career in the Mediterranean Fleet, while Goliath went to the China Station in 1900. Glory, Albion, and Ocean joined Goliath from 1901 to 1905, and Vengeance and Canopus was sent to join them in 1902 and 1905, respectively. In September 1902, Ocean was damaged by a typhoon. The Anglo-Japanese Alliance signed in 1905 allowed Britain to withdraw much of her East Asian naval strength, and the Canopus-class ships were recalled to European waters. On their return to Britain, most of them served brief stints with the Channel Fleet and then the Home Fleet and the Atlantic Fleet between 1905 and 1907. During this period, the ships also underwent major overhauls after their extended periods of service overseas. Goliath instead went to the Mediterranean Fleet from 1903 to 1906, followed by periods with the Channel Fleet and Home Fleet in 1906 and 1907, respectively.

Canopus, Glory, Ocean, and Goliath were sent to the Mediterranean Fleet in 1908, where they remained until the end of the decade. On 13 June 1908, Vengeance was damaged in a collision with the merchant ship SS Begore Head at Portsmouth; she was involved in another collision on 29 November 1910 with the merchant vessel SS Biter. Several of the ships, including Canopus and Glory were reduced to reserve status on their return to Britain, where they remained until the outbreak of the First World War in August 1914. Ocean, meanwhile, again served with the Home Fleet but saw little activity until the outbreak of war. Vengeance, for her part, served in secondary roles from 1908, including as a tender and a gunnery training ship. In 1913, she was transferred to the 6th Battle Squadron of the Second Fleet.

=== First World War ===
At the beginning of the First World War, the ships of the Canopus class were mobilised for service with the 8th Battle Squadron. Canopus was quickly sent to the South America Station, where she patrolled for German commerce raiders. She was involved in the search for the German East Asia Squadron of Vice Admiral Maximilian von Spee. Too slow to follow Admiral Sir Christopher Cradock's cruisers, she missed the Battle of Coronel in November 1914, where Cradock was defeated. Moored at Port Stanley as a defensive battery, she fired the first shots of the Battle of the Falklands in December, which led Spee to break off the attack before being chased down and destroyed by Admiral Doveton Sturdee's battlecruisers.

At the start of the conflict, Ocean was stationed in Ireland to support a cruiser squadron, but in October she was transferred to the East Indies Station to protect troopship convoys from India. Goliath initially served as a guard ship in Loch Ewe, one of the harbors used by the Grand Fleet, before escorting the crossing of British troops to Belgium in late August. She then took part in operations against German East Africa, participating in the blockade of the German light cruiser SMS Königsberg in the Rufiji River. In October 1914, Glory was transferred to the North America and West Indies Station, where she served as the squadron flagship. In late 1914, Ocean participated in an attack on Basra before being transferred to Egypt to defend the Suez Canal, where she joined Vengeance, which had been there since November. Albion was sent to the Atlantic to help defend against the possibility of German warships breaking out of the North Sea. In December and January 1915, she supported operations against German Southwest Africa.

==== Dardanelles campaign ====
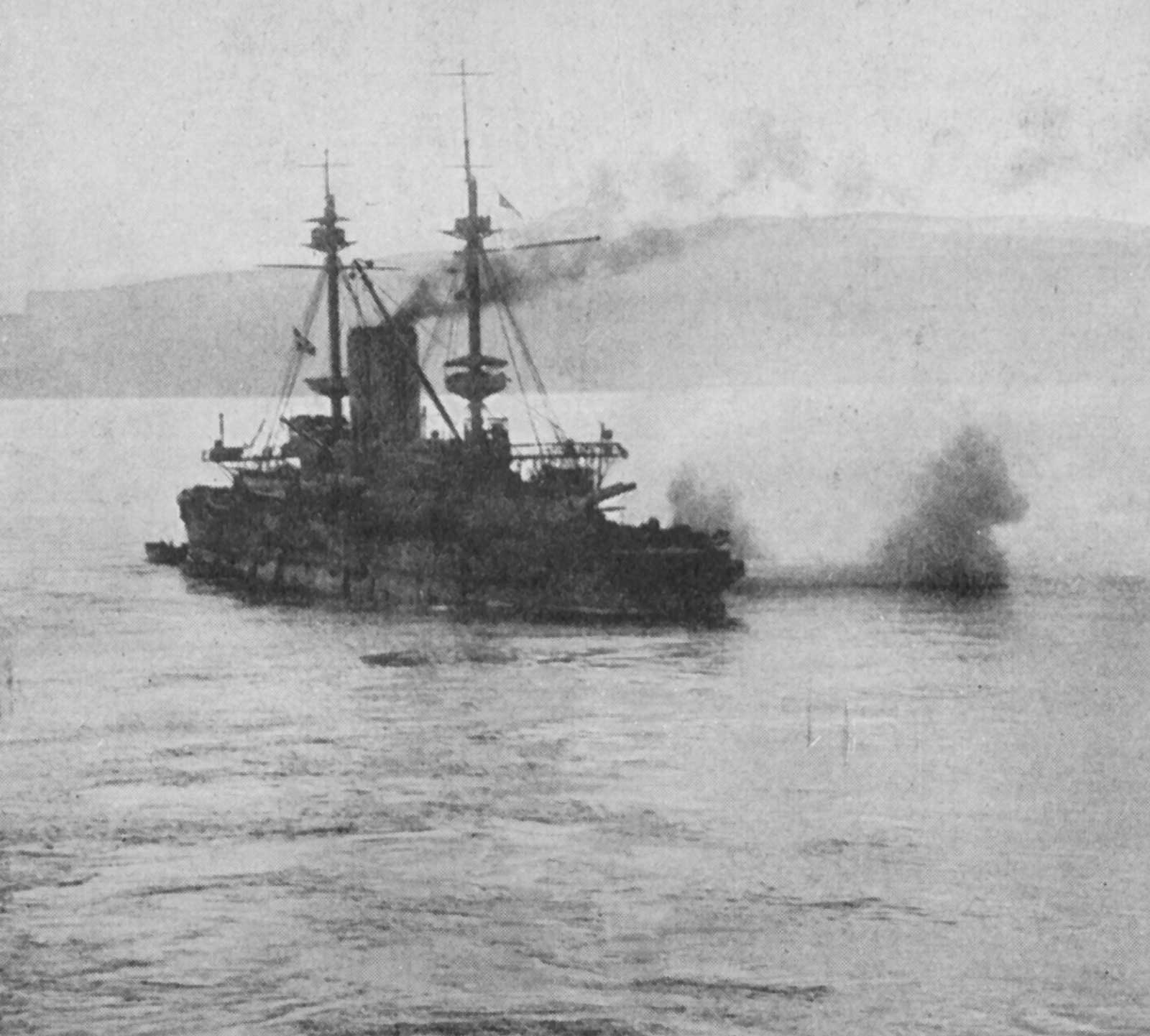
Albion during operations off the Dardanelles; a pair of Ottoman shells splash near the ship

Canopus, Albion, Ocean, and Vengeance were transferred to the Mediterranean in early 1915 for the Dardanelles Campaign. They participated in major attacks on the Ottoman coastal fortifications defending the Dardanelles in March 1915, but the British and French fleets proved incapable of forcing the straits. These included major attacks on 18 March that saw the loss of one French and two British battleships—one of which was Ocean—to Ottoman naval mines. Ocean had been attempting to rescue the crew from the battleship HMS Irresistible, which had also struck a mine, when she too was mined and sank. Most of her crew was able to evacuate to nearby destroyers. The surviving ships were repeatedly damaged by Ottoman coastal guns during these operations, but none seriously so. Allied infantry landed in April, beginning the Gallipoli campaign, and Canopus continued to bombard Ottoman positions to support them. These operations included the First Battle of Krithia and helping defeat Ottoman counter-attacks. On 13 May 1915 Goliath was sunk in Morto Bay off Cape Helles by three torpedoes from the Ottoman destroyer Muâvenet-i Millîye. Out of her crew of 750, 570 were killed in the sinking. In June 1915, Glory was reassigned to the Mediterranean to join her sisters in the campaign, though she saw little action during that time, as her crew was needed ashore to support the troops fighting on the peninsula.

==== Later careers ====
In October 1915, Albion was transferred to Salonika to support the Allied operations against Bulgaria through then-neutral Greece, but she saw no further action. She was transferred back to Ireland in April 1916 for service as a guard ship, a role she filled until October 1918, when she was reduced to a barracks ship. After the Gallipoli campaign ended with the withdrawal of Allied forces in January 1916, Canopus patrolled the eastern Mediterranean, but saw no further action. She was removed from service in April 1916 and was converted into a barracks ship in early 1918. In August 1916, Glory was sent to Murmansk, Russia, to support Britain's ally by keeping the vital port open for supplies being sent for the Eastern Front. There, she served as the flagship of the British North Russia Squadron. Worn out from operations off Gallipoli, Vengeance returned to Britain for a refit. She was recommissioned in December 1915 for service in East Africa, during which she supported the capture of Dar es Salaam in German East Africa. She returned to Britain again in 1917 and was decommissioned, thereafter serving in subsidiary roles until 1921.

After the war, the Royal Navy began discarding the ships. Albion was sold for scrap in December 1919 and broken up the following year, as was Canopus. Glory returned to Britain in 1919, was decommissioned, and was renamed HMS Crescent in 1920, before ultimately being sold to ship breakers in December 1922. Vengeance was sold for scrap in 1921 and broken up the next year.
