= HMS Diadem (1896) =

Cruiser of the Royal Navy

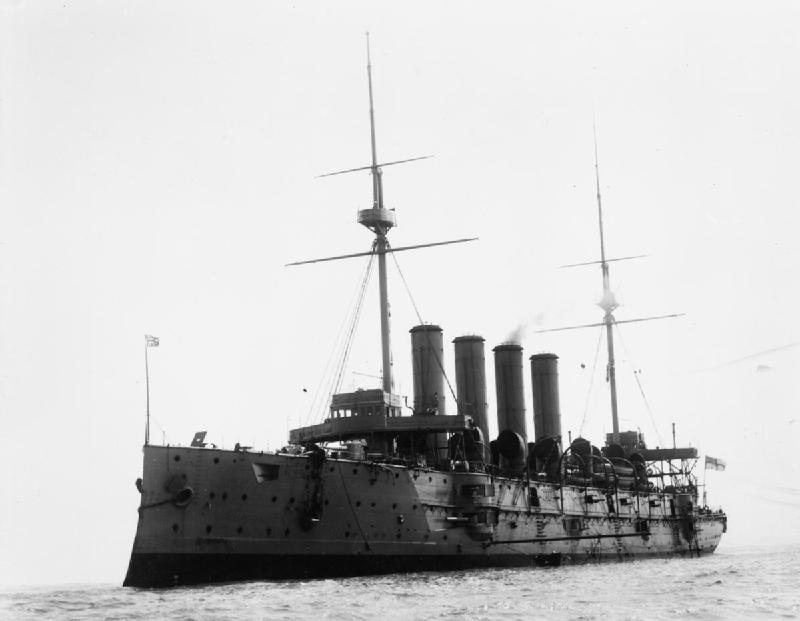
- HMS Diadem

History

United Kingdom
- Name: Diadem
- Operator: Royal Navy
- Builder: Fairfield Shipbuilding & Engineering Co Ltd, Govan
- Laid down: 23 January 1896
- Launched: 21 October 1896
- Christened: Lady Currie
- Fate: Sold 9 May 1921

General characteristics
- Class & type: Diadem-class cruiser
- Displacement: 11,000 tons
- Length: 435 ft (133 m) (462 ft 6 in (140.97 m) o/a)
- Beam: 69 ft (21 m)
- Draught: 25 ft 6 in (7.77 m)
- Propulsion: 2 shaft triple expansion engines; 16.500 - 18,000 hp
- Speed: 20 - 20.5 knots
- Complement: 760
- Armament: 16 × single QF 6-inch (152 mm) guns; 14 × single QF 12-pounder (76 mm) guns; 3 × single QF 3-pounder (47 mm) guns; 2 × 18-inch (450 mm) torpedo tubes
- Armour: 6 inch casemates; 4.5-2 inch decks

HMS Diadem was the lead ship of the Diadem-class of protected cruiser in the Royal Navy.

== Service history ==
Diadem was built by Fairfield Shipbuilding & Engineering Co Ltd at Govan. She was laid down on 23 January 1896, and launched on 21 October 1896, when she was named by Lady Currie, wife of Castle Line shipowner Sir Donald Currie.

She served in the Easter Division of the Channel Squadron under the command of Captain Harry Seawell Niblett, and was briefly docked at Chatham in January 1900 to make good defects.

In March 1901 Diadem was one of two cruisers to escort HMS Ophir, commissioned as royal yacht for the World tour of the Duke and Duchess of Cornwall and York (later King George V and Queen Mary), from Spithead to Gibraltar, and in September the same year she again escorted the royal yacht from St Vincent to Halifax, Nova Scotia. In January 1902 it was announced that she would be put out of commission due to "defects which will take some time to remedy". She was paid off at Chatham on 11 February 1902, and in May transported to Fairfield Shipbuilding and Engineering Company in Glasgow for repairs to her hull and machinery. She was back at Sheerness in early December 1902.

The ship was reactivated and sent to China Station where Diadem became the flagship of the vice-admiral until 1907. The vessel then returned home and was paid off in April 1907. She was then assigned to the Home Fleet based at Portsmouth from 1907–1912 before transferring to the Third Fleet. The ship was refitted in 1909.

Diadem served in the First World War with her sisters. In 1914 the vessel was used as a stokers' training ship, and was placed in reserve in October 1915. She was returned to being a stokers' training ship in January 1918, and survived the war to be sold to Thos. W. Ward of Morecambe for breaking up on 9 May 1921.
