= HMS Vivid (1891) =

History

United Kingdom
- Name: HMS Vivid
- Namesake: Capercailzie
- Builder: Barclay, Curl, and Co., Glasgow
- Yard number: 321
- Way number: 87699
- Launched: 20 June 1883
- Completed: 1883
- Acquired: 1891
- In service: 1891-1913
- Renamed: Launched as Capercailzie; Renamed HMS Vivid in 1891
- Fate: Wrecked on 8 July 1913

General characteristics
- Tonnage: 391 GRT
- Displacement: 550 tons
- Length: 200 ft (61 m)
- Beam: 24 ft (7.3 m)
- Draft: 12 ft (3.7 m)
- Installed power: 450 hp
- Propulsion: 1 x 2-cylinder compound engine, single shaft, 1 screw, 2 masts
- Speed: 10 knots (19 km/h)

HMS Vivid was an iron screw yacht purchased from civilian service in 1891, where she had been named SS Capercailzie. She became the Devonport base ship and flagship in 1893 and was also used as the yacht for the Commander-in-Chief, Plymouth and was sold in 1912, later being wrecked in 1913.

== Early civilian service ==
SS Capercailzie was built by Barclay, Curl, and Co. in 1883 on the Clyde. She was owned by George Burns, a shipping company owner, who sold her to the Royal Navy in 1891.

== Military service ==
On 26 September 1891, SS Capercailzie was purchased by the Royal Navy and renamed SS Vivid for use as tender for the Devonport naval base, Plymouth and as a yacht for the port admiral. She was later designated flagship for the Commodore-in-Command of the Royal Naval Barracks, Devonport. Staff Commander W. Way was in command in early 1900.

Captain Sir Richard Poore, 4th Baronet was appointed flag captain for command of the RN Barracks on 9 March 1900, succeeded by Captain Harry Seawell Niblett in December 1902.

== Later Civilian Service ==
In 1912, she was sold to the Royal Technical College, Glasgow for use as a training ship. The purchase was a major investment for the college, spending an estimated £3000 on the ship and refit. On 8 July 1913 she ran aground and was wrecked at Colonsay en route from Rhu (at the time spelt ‘Row’) to Stornoway on her first voyage as a civilian training ship.
