= Thomas Webster Kemp =

Royal Navy Admiral (1866–1928)

Thomas Webster Kemp CB CMG CIE (27 September 1866 – 13 January 1928) was an Admiral of the Royal Navy.

== Career ==
Kemp joined the Royal Navy and was promoted to lieutenant on 1 January 1890. He served in China, and for his services was promoted to commander on 9 November 1900.

He was appointed in command of the special service vessel HMS Sphinx on the East Indies Station in October 1901, and remained in command for three years until October 1904. During this time he served as Senior Naval Officer, Persian Gulf.

In 1917 Rear Admiral Kemp was given command of the British North Russia Squadron. As commander of the naval forces in North Russia, Admiral Kemp directed light cruiser HMS Attentive (1904) and seaplane carrier HMS Nairana (1917) in the seizing of Mudyug Island. These action against Bolshevik-controlled batteries on Mudyug island constituted the first combined sea-air attack ever performed by British forces.
