= HMS Rifleman (1910) =

Destroyer of the Royal Navy

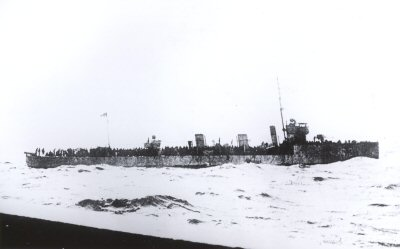
- Rifleman on 1 January 1917 during the rescue of troops from Ivernia

History

United Kingdom
- Name: Rifleman
- Builder: J. Samuel White & Company, Cowes
- Launched: 22 August 1910
- Fate: Sold on 9 May 1921; Scrapped in 1923

General characteristics
- Class & type: Acorn-class destroyer
- Displacement: 772 tons
- Length: 246 ft (75.0 m)
- Beam: 25.2 ft (7.7 m)
- Draught: 8.5 ft (2.6 m)
- Propulsion: 4 Yarrow boilers, Parsons turbines, 13,500 shp (10,100 kW)
- Speed: 27 knots (50 km/h; 31 mph)
- Complement: 72
- Armament: 2 × BL 4-inch (101.6 mm) L/40 Mark VIII guns, mounting P Mark V; 2 × QF 12 pdr 12 cwt Mark I mounting P Mark I; 2 × 21-inch (533 mm) torpedo tubes
- Notes: Pennant numbers: H82 (1914); H97 (from January 1918)

HMS Rifleman was an Acorn-class destroyer built by J. Samuel White & Company, Cowes, completed on 4 November 1910 and sold for breaking up on 9 May 1921.

== Construction and design ==
The British Admiralty ordered 20 Acorn-class destroyers as part of the 1909–1910 shipbuilding programme for the Royal Navy. Three of the class, Rifleman, Redpole and Ruby, were to be built by J. Samuel White.

Rifleman was 240 ft 0 in (73.15 m) long between perpendiculars and 246 ft 0 in (74.98 m) overall, with a beam of 25 ft 3 in (7.70 m) and a draught of between 7 ft 4 1/2 in (2.248 m) and 8 ft 10 in (2.69 m) depending on load. Displacement was 760 long tons (770 t) normal and 855 long tons (869 t) full load. The ship's machinery consisted of four White-Forster boilers feeding steam to Parsons steam turbines which drove three propeller shafts. The machinery was rated at 13,500 shaft horsepower (10,100 kW) giving a design speed of 27 knots (50 km/h; 31 mph). The ship had a crew of 72 officers and enlisted.

Gun armament consisted of two 4-inch (102 mm) BL Mk VIII guns, (Note: The abbreviation BL stood for Breech Loading. In British use it also indicated that the gun used a bagged charge, with QF (Quick Firing) meaning that the gun used a charge enclosed in a metal cartridge case.) one on the ship's forecastle and one aft, and two 12-pounder (76 mm) QF 12 cwt guns (Note: "Cwt" is the abbreviation for hundredweight, 12 cwt referring to the weight of the gun.) carried in the waist position between the first two funnels. Torpedo armament consisted of two 21-inch (533 mm) torpedo tubes, with two reload torpedoes carried. The torpedo tubes were aft of the funnels, mounted singly with a searchlight position between them. By 1918, a 3-pounder (47 mm) anti-aircraft gun was fitted, and depth charges were carried.

Rifleman was laid down at White's Cowes, Isle of Wight shipyard on 21 December 1909 and launched on 22 August 1910. Rifleman reached a speed of 28.6 knots (53.0 km/h; 32.9 mph) during sea trials and was completed in March 1911.

== Service ==
On commissioning, Rifleman joined the 2nd Destroyer Flotilla of the Royal Navy's Home Fleet, and was joined by her sister ships as they commissioned. She was one of seven destroyers that suffered problems when steaming at full speed off the coast of Ireland during the 1911 Naval Manoeuvres, with serious leaks of water through hull rivets into the ships' oil tanks, requiring that they put into Portland Harbour for repairs. Rifleman was still part of the 2nd Flotilla in August 1914, on the eve of the outbreak of the First World War.

=== First World War ===
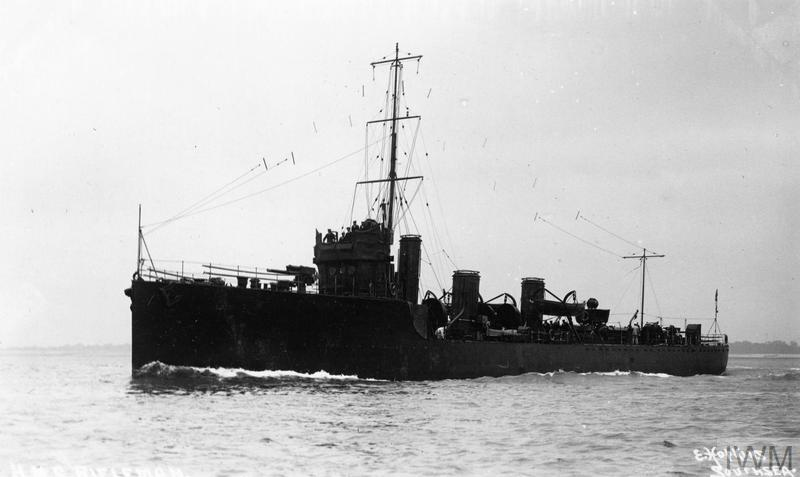
HMS Rifleman

On the outbreak of the First World War, the 2nd Destroyer Flotilla, including Rifleman joined the newly established Grand Fleet at Scapa Flow. On 23 August 1914, Rifleman collided with the destroyer Comet, with Comet receiving significant damage. On 12–13 November 1914, Rifleman and sister ship Larne were ordered to investigate sightings of submarines off the Outer Hebrides. Although they reported that there was "indisputable evidence" of submarine activity, the sightings were in fact imaginary.

In early February 1915, Rifleman was one of four destroyers of the 2nd Flotilla (Note: Cameleon, Larne, Rifleman and Ruby.) ordered to the Irish sea to join a large force of destroyers searching for the German submarine U-21, with Rifleman's division, led by Cameleon, operating out of Barrow-in-Furness. No sign was found of U-21, which had left for Germany before any of the destroyers started search and patrol operations. After these operations finished, Rifleman's division escorted the battleship Conqueror to Liverpool, arriving on 14 February, before setting off for Scapa Flow. Leaks forced Rifleman to dock at Greenock for repairs, however, with Rifleman not reaching Scapa until 28 February. (Note: Ruby and Cameleon also had to stop at Greenock for repairs, with Ruby also suffering leaks, while Cameleon collided with the berth wall at Greenock.) On 22 May 1915, Rifleman ran aground in fog, forcing her to be docked for repairs.

By January 1916, Rifleman had left the 2nd Destroyer Flotilla, moving to the Mediterranean and joining the 5th Destroyer Flotilla. On 1 January 1917 the German U-boat UB-47 torpedoed the Cunard liner RMS Ivernia off Cape Matapan, Greece. She was en route to Alexandria with 2,400 Scottish troops aboard; of these 85 drowned, together with 36 crew. Rifleman, the escorting destroyer, took off 650 and armed trawlers towed the remainder of the survivors in their lifeboats to Crete.

On 15 April 1917 the SS Cameronia was en route from Marseilles to Alexandria, Egypt, when the German U-boat U-33 torpedoed her 150 miles (240 km) east of Malta. Cameronia was a 10,963-ton passenger liner that had been converted to a troopship in January 1917. She was carrying 2,650 troops and the exact number of deaths is unknown, though the number is likely to be 11 crew members and 129 troops. The Chatby Memorial in Egypt lists the names of 127 soldiers as having been lost with Cameronia. The vessel that carried the survivors to Suda was likely the Rifleman.

On 20 January 1918, Rifleman was listed as under refit at Gibraltar. Rifleman was still a member of the 5th Destroyer Flotilla at the end of the war on 11 November 1918.

== Disposal ==
Following the end of the war, pre-war destroyers like the Acorns were quickly laid up into reserve. Rifleman had been ordered home by March 1919, and was in reserve at Portsmouth by May 1919. She was sold on 9 May 1921 to Ward for scrapping at their Briton Ferry, South Wales yard.

== Pennant numbers ==
| Pennant number | Date |
|---|---|
| H82 | 1914 |
| H97 | January 1918 |
