= HMS Martin (1910) =

Destroyer of the Royal Navy

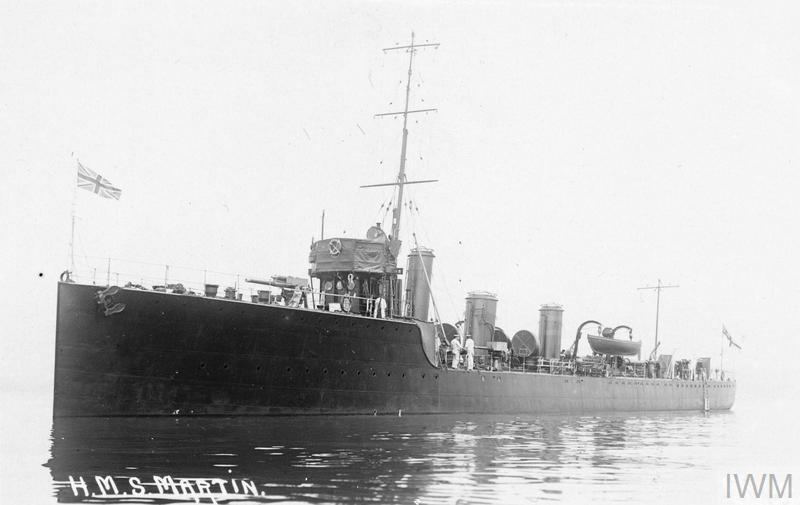
- Martin

History

United Kingdom
- Name: Martin
- Builder: John I. Thornycroft & Company, Woolston
- Laid down: 21 December 1909
- Launched: 15 December 1910
- Completed: March 1911
- Out of service: 21 August 1920
- Fate: Sold to be broken up

General characteristics (as built)
- Class & type: Acorn-class destroyer
- Displacement: 730 long tons (740 t) (normal); 855 long tons (869 t) (full load)
- Length: 246 ft (75 m) (o.a.); 240 ft (73 m) (p.p.)
- Beam: 25 ft 5 in (7.7 m)
- Draught: 8 ft 6 in (2.6 m)
- Installed power: 4 Yarrow boilers, 13,500 shp (10,100 kW)
- Propulsion: Parsons steam turbines, 3 shafts
- Speed: 27 kn (50 km/h; 31 mph)
- Range: 1,540 nmi (2,850 km; 1,770 mi) at 15 kn (28 km/h; 17 mph)
- Complement: 72
- Armament: 2 × single BL 4 in (102 mm) guns; 2 × single QF 12 pdr 3 in (76 mm) guns; 2 × single 21 in (533 mm) torpedo tubes

HMS Martin was one of 20 Acorn-class (later H-class) destroyers built for the Royal Navy. The destroyer served in the First World War. The Acorn class was smaller than the preceding Beagle class but oil-fired and better armed. Launched in 1910, Martin joined the Second Destroyer Flotilla. After the British Empire declared war on Germany at the beginning of the First World War, the ship joined the Grand Fleet and was based at Devonport. While undertaking anti-submarine patrols and escorting merchant ships around the British Isles, the destroyer damaged the submarine U-60 and potentially sank U-69. Martin ended the war in Brindisi with the Mediterranean Fleet. After the Armistice, the destroyer remained in the Mediterranean until being sold to be broken up in 1920.

== Design and description ==
The first decade of the twentieth century saw dramatic strides in the development of destroyers, and the Royal Navy demanded more powerful designs capable of independent operation. The coal-burning Beagle class were followed by the Acorn class, which saw the Navy return to oil-firing. Pioneered by the Tribal class of 1905 and HMS Swift of 1907, using oil enabled a more efficient design, leading to a smaller vessel which also had increased deck space available for weaponry. In addition, unlike previous destroyer designs, where the individual yards had been given discretion within the parameters set by the Admiralty, the Acorn class was a set, with the propulsion machinery the only major variation between the different ships. This enabled costs to be reduced. The class was renamed H class in October 1913.

Martin was 240 feet (73 metres) long between perpendiculars and 246 ft (75 m) overall, with a beam of 25 ft 5 in (7.7 m) and a deep draught of 8 ft 6 in (2.6 m). Displacement was 730 long tons (820 short tons; 740 tonnes) normal and 855 long tons (958 short tons; 869 t) full load. Power was provided by Parsons steam turbines, fed by four Yarrow boilers. Parsons supplied a set of direct-drive turbines that drove three shafts. Three funnels were fitted. The engines were rated at 13,500 shaft horsepower (10,100 kW) and design speed was 27 knots (50 km/h; 31 mph). On trial, Martin achieved 28.9 kn (53.5 km/h; 33.3 mph). The vessel carried 170 long tons (170 t) of fuel oil which gave a range of 1,540 nautical miles (2,850 km; 1,770 mi) at a cruising speed of 15 kn (28 km/h; 17 mph).

Armament consisted of a single BL 4 in (102 mm) Mk VIII gun carried on the forecastle and another aft. Two single QF 12-pounder 3 in (76 mm) guns were mounted between the first two funnels. Two rotating 21-inch (533 mm) torpedo tubes were mounted aft of the funnels, with two reloads carried, and a searchlight fitted between the tubes. The destroyer was later modified to carry a single Vickers QF 3-pounder 2 in (47 mm) anti-aircraft gun and depth charges for anti-submarine warfare. The ship's complement was 72 officers and ratings.

== Construction and career ==
The 20 destroyers of the Acorn class were ordered by the Admiralty under the 1909–1910 Naval Programme. One of three in the class built by John I. Thornycroft & Company, Martin was laid down at the company's Woolston shipyard on 21 December 1909, launched on 15 December 1910 and completed in March 1911. The ship was the eleventh in Royal Navy service to be given the name.

Martin joined the Second Destroyer Flotilla. After the British Empire declared war on Germany at the beginning of the First World War in August 1914, the flotilla became part of the Grand Fleet. Between 13 and 15 October 1915, the flotilla supported the battleships of the Grand Fleet in a training exercise. On 8 November 1916, the destroyer, alongside sister ship Brisk and the Thornycroft-built Acasta-class destroyer Unity, left Devonport to search for submarines. The search was unsuccessful in finding any enemy vessels, but no British ships were attacked during the next two days. This was a rare hiatus, sinkings resuming immediately afterwards. The destroyer was then deployed to Dover. On 3 December, Martin, alongside sister ship Hope, was called upon to join a search for submarines in the English Channel. The lack of success with British anti-submarine measures had meant that merchant shipping had ceased travelling through the Strait of Dover. The search was unsuccessful and instead the ships continued to have to route via the western coast of Britain.

From January 1917, Martin escorted merchant ships off the Isles of Scilly. On 19 February, the destroyer escorted SS Headley, which was attacked by torpedo by the submarine U-60. When the merchant ship sank, the destroyer followed the torpedo's track to find the submarine and dropped depth charges that are reported by the crew of the submarine to have caused damage as the boat escaped. On 7 August, the destroyer was leaving Lough Swilly to join a convoy when the crew saw a periscope off the port side. The ship sped to the spot as the submarine submerged and attacked. Sister ships Lyra, Ruby and three other destroyers quickly followed and between them the warships laid a pattern of 13 depth charges. Although it is not confirmed, the submarine may have been U-44, in which case it escaped. Alternatively, it may have been U-69, which was sunk during that period. On 2 October, the destroyer was called to escort the Drake-class armoured cruiser Drake, returning to port after being torpedoed by a German submarine. The stricken vessel attempted to beach but before that could be completed, the cruiser started to capsize. The crew evacuated, the Arabis-class sloop Delphinium and Martin sharing the responsibility for taking them to shore.

During 1918, the destroyer was transferred to the Mediterranean Fleet based at Brindisi. After the Armistice, Martin remained with the Mediterranean Fleet. The deployment did not last long. The Royal Navy needed to return to a peacetime level of strength and both the number of ships and personnel were reduced to save money. On 21 August 1920, the vessel was sold in Malta to be broken up by Agius Bros.

== Pennant numbers ==
Pennant number	Date
H65	December 1914
H71	January 1918
H21	January 1919
