= HMS Alarm (1910) =

Destroyer of the Royal Navy

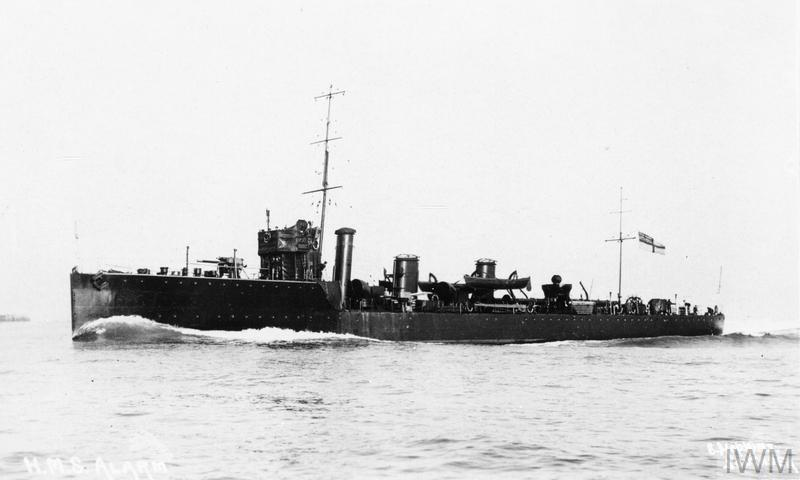
- HMS Alarm

History

United Kingdom
- Name: HMS Alarm
- Builder: John Brown and Company, Clydebank
- Laid down: 7 February 1910
- Launched: 28 August 1910
- Completed: March 1911
- Fate: Sold for scrapping May 1921

General characteristics
- Class & type: Acorn-class destroyer
- Displacement: 760 long tons (770 t) normal
- Length: 246 ft 0 in (74.98 m) oa
- Beam: 25 ft 3 in (7.70 m)
- Draught: 8 ft 10 in (2.69 m)
- Propulsion: 4 Yarrow boilers, Parsons turbines, 13,500 shp (10,100 kW)
- Speed: 27 kn (50 km/h; 31 mph)
- Complement: 72
- Armament: 2 × BL 4 inch naval gun Mk VIII guns; 2 × QF 12-pounder 12 cwt naval gun; 2 21 in (533 mm) torpedo tubes

HMS Alarm was a Acorn-class destroyer of the British Royal Navy. She was built by John Brown and Company at their Clydebank shipyard, being built between 1910 and 1911, completing in March 1911. Alarm had oil-fuelled steam turbine machinery that was designed to give a speed of 27 knots (31 mph; 50 km/h). Armament consisted of two 4-inch (102 mm) guns, two 12-pounder (3-inch, 76 mm) guns and two 21-inch (533 mm) torpedo tubes.

Alarm served through the First World War, both in the North Sea as part of the Grand Fleet and later in the Mediterranean Sea. She was sold for scrap in 1921.

== Construction and design ==
The British Admiralty ordered 20 Acorn-class destroyers as part of the 1909–1910 shipbuilding programme for the Royal Navy. Three of the class, Alarm, Acorn and Brisk, were to be built by the Clydebank shipbuilder John Brown and Company. Alarm was laid down on 7 February 1910 and launched on 28 August 1910. Alarm reached a speed of 27.2 kn (31.3 mph; 50.4 km/h) during sea trials and was completed in March 1911.

Alarm was 240 ft 0 in (73.15 m) long between perpendiculars and 246 ft 0 in (74.98 m) overall, with a beam of 25 ft 3 in (7.70 m) and a draught of between 7 ft 4 1/2 in (2.248 m) and 8 ft 10 in (2.69 m) depending on load. Displacement was 760 long tons (770 t) normal and 855 long tons (869 t) full load. The ship's machinery consisted of four Yarrow boilers feeding steam to Parsons steam turbines which drove three propeller shafts. The machinery was rated at 13,500 shaft horsepower (10,100 kW) giving a design speed of 27 knots (50 km/h; 31 mph). The ship had a crew of 72 officers and enlisted.

Gun armament consisted of two 4-inch (102 mm) BL Mk VIII guns, (Note: The abbreviation BL stood for Breech Loading. In British use it also indicated that the gun used a bagged charge, with QF (Quick Firing) meaning that the gun used a charge enclosed in a metal cartridge case.) one on the ship's forecastle and one aft, and two 12-pounder (76 mm) QF 12 cwt guns (Note: "Cwt" is the abbreviation for hundredweight, 12cwt referring to the weight of the gun.) carried in the waist position between the first two funnels. Torpedo armament consisted of two 21-inch (533 mm) torpedo tubes, with two reload torpedoes carried. The torpedo tubes were aft of the funnels, mounted singly with a searchlight position between them. By 1918, a 3-pounder (47 mm) anti aircraft gun was fitted, and depth charges were carried.

== Service ==
On commissioning, Alarm joined the 2nd Destroyer Flotilla of the Royal Navy's Home Fleet, and was joined by her sister ships as they commissioned. She was one of seven destroyers that suffered problems when steaming at full speed off the coast of Ireland during the 1911 Naval Manoeuvres, with serious leaks of water through hull rivets into the ships' oil tanks, requiring that they put into Portland Harbour for repairs. On 26 January 1912, Alarm was one of seven destroyers and one torpedo boat that was ordered to be fitted with anti-submarine sweeps. These were explosive charges that were carried on cables that were towed behind the ship. When the cable caught on a submerged submarine, the explosive charge would be drawn down the cable onto the submarine. Alarm was still part of the 2nd Flotilla in August 1914, on the eve of the outbreak of the First World War.

On the outbreak of the First World War, the 2nd Destroyer Flotilla, including Alarm joined the newly established Grand Fleet at Scapa Flow. On 16 October 1914, four destroyers of the 2nd Flotilla, Lyra, Nymphe, Nemesis and Alarm were patrolling at the eastern end of the Pentland Firth between Orkney and mainland Scotland. At about 1:15 pm that day, Nymphe spotted a periscope. It was the German submarine U-9, which had sunk the British cruiser Hawke the previous day. U-9 launched a torpedo which narrowly missed both Nymphe and Alarm, and while Nymphe attempted to ram the submarine, U-9 escaped.

The 2nd Flotilla remained at Scapa Flow until March 1916, but by April the flotilla, including Alarm, had moved to Devonport naval base in Plymouth. On 13 November 1916, Alarm was ordered to rendezvous with the transport Idaho, bound for Portland from New York with a load of explosives, but fog delayed Alarm's departure from Devonport, so that Idaho was unescorted when the German submarine U-49 attacked. Idaho's crew abandoned ship, but the destroyer Tigress had heard Idaho's SOS radio signals, and arrived in time to drive off U-49 and save Idaho. On 22 March 1917, Alarm and Tigress were employed in escorting the battleship Duncan. On 24 March 1917, Alarm picked up 11 survivors from the merchant ship Achille Adam, sunk the previous day by the submarine UB-39 when bound for Newhaven from Saint-Valery-sur-Somme.

In July 1917, the 2nd Flotilla, including Alarm, moved to Buncrana in the north of Ireland. By December 1917, Alarm had moved to the Mediterranean Fleet, joining the 5th Destroyer Flotilla.

On the night of 22/23 April 1918, Alarm was one of six destroyers patrolling in the Otranto Straits to protect the drifters of the Otranto Barrage from attack by Austro-Hungarian naval forces. Alarm and the French destroyer Cimeterre patrolled the Eastern side of the straits, with Comet and the Australian destroyer Torrens on station at the centre of the straits and Jackal and Hornet at the Western side of the straits, with the three groups of destroyers separate by 10 mi (16 km). At about 21:10hr, five unknown ships were spotted by Hornet, which challenged them. In response, the unknown ships, which were actually the Austro-Hungarian destroyers Triglav, Uzsok, Dukla, Lika and Csepel, opened fire. Both Hornet and Jackal were damaged in the exchange of fire, but the Austro-Hungarian ships abandoned their raid as the alarm had been raised. Alarm, Cimeterre, Comet and Torrens responded to the gunfire, and joining up with Jackal chased after the Austro-Hungarian ships, but broke off the pursuit as they approached the enemy coast, owing to the risk from mines. Alarm was still a member of the 5th Destroyer Flotilla at the end of the war on 11 November 1918.

== Disposal ==
Following the end of the war, pre-war destroyers like the Acorns were quickly laid up into reserve. Alarm was laid up at Portsmouth by March 1919. She was sold on 9 May 1921 to Ward for scrapping at their Hayle, Cornwall yard.

== Pennant Numbers ==
Pennant number	Date
H05	1914
H04	January 1918
