= HMS Acorn (1910) =

British naval ship

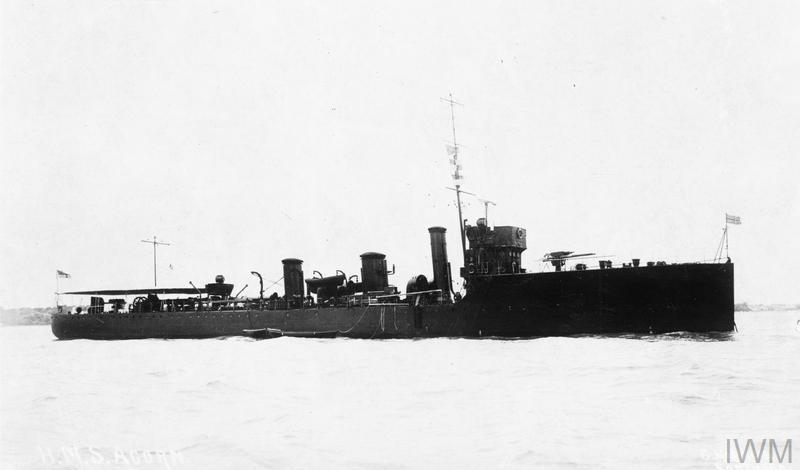
- Acorn

History

United Kingdom
- Name: HMS Acorn
- Builder: John Brown and Company, Clydebank
- Laid down: 12 January 1910
- Launched: 1 July 1910
- Completed: December 1910
- Fate: Sold for scrapping 29 November 1921

General characteristics
- Class & type: Acorn-class destroyer
- Displacement: 760 long tons (770 t) normal
- Length: 246 ft 0 in (74.98 m) oa
- Beam: 25 ft 3 in (7.70 m)
- Draught: 8 ft 10 in (2.69 m)
- Propulsion: 4 Yarrow boilers, Parsons turbines, 13,500 shp (10,100 kW)
- Speed: 27 kn (50 km/h; 31 mph)
- Complement: 72
- Armament: 2 × BL 4 inch naval gun Mk VIII guns; 2 × QF 12-pounder 12 cwt naval gun; 2 21 in (533 mm) torpedo tubes

HMS Acorn was a destroyer of the British Royal Navy and the lead ship of her class. She was built by John Brown and Company at their Clydebank shipyard, being built and completed in 1910. The ship served throughout the First World War and was sold for scrap in 1921.

== Construction and design ==
The British Admiralty ordered 20 Acorn-class destroyers as part of the 1909–1910 shipbuilding programme for the Royal Navy. Three of the class, Acorn, Alarm and Brisk, were to be built by the Clydebank shipbuilder John Brown and Company. Acorn, the first of the three and the lead ship of the class, was laid down on 12 January 1910 and launched on 1 July 1910. Acorn reached a speed of 27.355 knots (50.661 km/h; 31.480 mph) during sea trials and was completed in December 1910.

Acorn was 240 feet 0 inches (73.15 m) long between perpendiculars and 246 feet 0 inches (74.98 m) overall, with a beam of 25 feet 3 inches (7.70 m) and a draught of between 7 feet 4 1/2 inches (2.248 m) and 8 feet 10 inches (2.69 m) depending on load. Displacement was 760 long tons (770 t) normal and 855 long tons (869 t) full load. The ship's machinery consisted of four Yarrow boilers feeding steam to Parsons steam turbines which drove three propeller shafts. The machinery was rated at 13,500 shaft horsepower (10,100 kW) giving a design speed of 27 knots (50 km/h; 31 mph). The ship had a crew of 72 officers and enlisted.

Gun armament consisted of two 4-inch (102 mm) BL Mk VIII guns, (Note: The abbreviation BL stood for Breech Loading. In British use it also indicated that the gun used a bagged charge, with QF (Quick Firing) meaning that the gun used a charge enclosed in a metal cartridge case.) one on the ship's forecastle and one aft, and two 12-pounder (76 mm) QF 12 cwt guns (Note: "Cwt" is the abbreviation for hundredweight, 12cwt referring to the weight of the gun.) carried in the waist position between the first two funnels. Torpedo armament consisted of two 21-inch (533 mm) torpedo tubes, with two reload torpedoes carried. The torpedo tubes were aft of the funnels, mounted singly with a searchlight position between them.

== Service ==
On commissioning, Acorn joined the 2nd Destroyer Flotilla of the Royal Navy's Home Fleet, and was joined by her sister ships as they commissioned. She was involved in a collision with her sister ship, Redpole, on 7 March 1911, and took part in the Coronation Fleet Review on 24 July 1911. Acorn was one of seven destroyers that suffered problems when steaming at full speed off the coast of Ireland during the 1911 Naval Manoeuvres, with serious leaks of water through hull rivets into the ships' oil tanks, requiring that the seven destroyers put into Portland Harbour for repairs.

On the outbreak of the First World War in August 1914, the 2nd Destroyer Flotilla, including Acorn joined the newly established Grand Fleet. Acorn remained part of the 2nd Destroyer Flotilla until November 1915, then transferring to the 5th Destroyer Flotilla, part of the Mediterranean Fleet, arriving at Malta on 31 December. Acorn and the River-class destroyer Colne were used for trials of hydrophones during 1917. In a friendly fire incident on 20 June 1918, she opened gunfire on the U.S. Navy submarine chaser USS SC-151 in the Strait of Otranto. She fired four or five rounds, all of which missed.

Acorn remained part of the Mediterranean Fleet at the end of the war in November 1918, when she was serving in the Aegean Squadron, based at Mudros.

== Disposal ==
Acorn was in reserve at Devonport Naval Base in March 1919, and was sold for scrap to Marple & Gillot of Saltash on 29 November 1921.

== Pennant Numbers ==
Pennant number	Date
H02	1914
H03	January 1918

== Bibliography ==
- Dittmar, F.J.; Colledge, J.J. (1972). British Warships 1914–1919. Shepperton, UK: Ian Allan. ISBN 0-7110-0380-7.
- Friedman, Norman (2009). British Destroyers: From Earliest Days to the Second World War. Barnsley, UK: Seaforth Publishing. ISBN 978-1-84832-049-9.
- Friedman, Norman (2014). Fighting the Great War at Sea: Strategy, Tactic and Technology. Barnsley, UK: Seaforth Publishing. ISBN 978-1-84832-189-2.
- Gardiner, Robert; Gray, Randal, eds. (1985). Conway's All The World's Fighting Ships 1906–1921. London: Conway Maritime Press. ISBN 0-85177-245-5.
- Jellicoe, John (1919). The Grand Fleet 1914–16: Its Creation, Development and Work. London: Cassell and Company. OCLC 859842281.
- Manning, T.D. (1961). The British Destroyer. London: Putnam. OCLC 6470051.
