= HMS Fury (1911) =

Destroyer of the Royal Navy

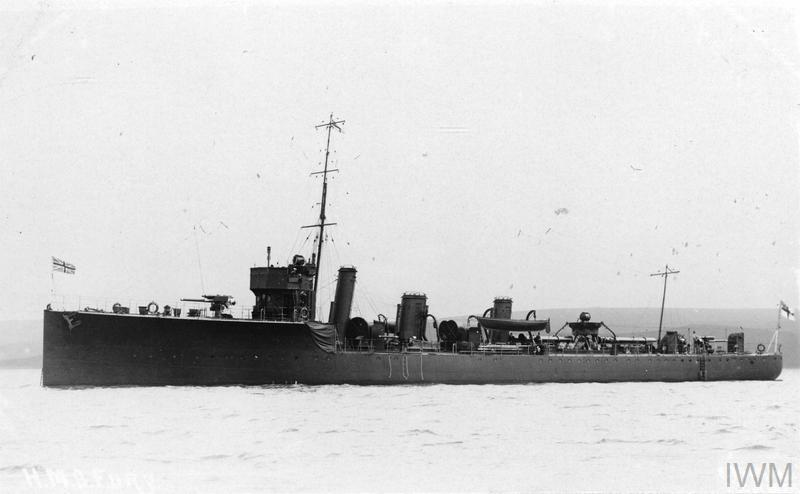
- Fury

History

United Kingdom
- Name: Fury
- Builder: A. & J. Inglis, Glasgow
- Laid down: 3 March 1910
- Launched: 23 April 1911
- Completed: February 1912
- Out of service: 4 November 1921
- Fate: Sold to be broken up

General characteristics (as built)
- Class & type: Acorn-class destroyer
- Displacement: 730 long tons (740 t) (normal); 855 long tons (869 t) (full load)
- Length: 246 ft (75 m) (o.a.); 240 ft (73 m) (p.p.)
- Beam: 25 ft 5 in (7.7 m)
- Draught: 8 ft 6 in (2.6 m)
- Installed power: 4 Yarrow boilers, 13,500 shp (10,100 kW)
- Propulsion: Parsons steam turbines, 3 shafts
- Speed: 27 kn (50 km/h; 31 mph)
- Range: 1,540 nmi (2,850 km; 1,770 mi) at 15 kn (28 km/h; 17 mph)
- Complement: 72
- Armament: 2 × single BL 4 in (102 mm) guns; 2 × single QF 12 pdr 3 in (76 mm) guns; 2 × single 21 in (533 mm) torpedo tubes

HMS Fury was one of 20 Acorn-class (later H-class) destroyers built for the Royal Navy that served in the First World War. The Acorn class was smaller than the preceding Beagle class but oil-fired and better armed. Launched in 1910, Fury served with the Second Destroyer Flotilla, joining the Grand Fleet at the start of the war. Soon afterwards, in August 1914, the destroyer assisted in the unsuccessful attempt to rescue the stricken dreadnought battleship Audacious. In 1916, the vessel was transferred to the Mediterranean Fleet, joining the Fifth Destroyer Flotilla. After the Armistice in 1918, the destroyer was placed in reserve. Fury was sold to be broken up in 1921.

== Design and description ==
After the preceding coal-burning Beagle class, the Acorn-class destroyer saw a return to oil-firing. Pioneered by the Tribal class of 1905 and HMS Swift of 1907, using oil enabled a more efficient design, leading to a smaller vessel which also had increased deck space available for weaponry. Unlike previous destroyer designs, where the individual yards had been given discretion within the parameters set by the Admiralty, the Acorn class was a set, with the propulsion machinery the only major variation between the different ships. This enabled costs to be reduced. The ships was later renamed H class.

Fury had a length of 240 feet (73 m) between perpendiculars and 246 ft (75 m) overall, with a beam of 25 ft 5 in (7.7 m) and a deep draught of 8 ft 6 in (2.6 m). Displacement was 730 long tons (820 short tons; 740 tonnes) normal and 855 long tons (958 short tons; 869 t) full load. Power was provided by Parsons steam turbines, fed by four Yarrow boilers. Parsons supplied a set of direct-drive turbines that drove three shafts. Three funnels were fitted. The engines were rated at 13,500 shaft horsepower (10,100 kW) and design speed was 27 knots (50 km/h; 31 mph). On trial, Fury achieved 29.3 kn (54.3 km/h; 33.7 mph). The vessel carried 170 long tons (170 t) of fuel oil which gave a range of 1,540 nautical miles (2,850 km; 1,770 mi) at a cruising speed of 15 kn (28 km/h; 17 mph).

Armament consisted of a single BL 4 in (102 mm) Mk VIII gun carried on the forecastle and another aft. Two single QF 12-pounder 3 in (76 mm) guns were mounted between the first two funnels. Two rotating 21-inch (533 mm) torpedo tubes were mounted aft of the funnels, with two reloads carried, and a searchlight fitted between the tubes. The destroyer was later modified to carry a single Vickers QF 3-pounder 2 in (47 mm) anti-aircraft gun and depth charges for anti-submarine warfare. The ship's complement was 72 officers and ratings.

== Construction and career ==
The 20 destroyers of the Acorn class were ordered by the Admiralty under the 1909–1910 Naval Programme. Fury was laid down by A. & J. Inglis at the company's Pointhouse shipyard in Glasgow on 3 March 1910, launched on 23 April the following year and completed in February 1912. The vessel was the tenth ship in Royal Navy service to be given the name, the first recorded use being in 1779. On commissioning, Fury joined the Second Destroyer Flotilla.

After the British Empire declared war on Germany at the beginning of the First World War in August 1914, the Flotilla became part of the Grand Fleet based at Scapa Flow. After the dreadnought battleship Audacious struck a naval mine on 27 October, Fury was one of the vessels sent out as a rescue party. Despite taking the line to, in succession, the ocean liner Olympic, light cruiser Liverpool and collier Thornhill, none of the ships were able to save the stricken ship. On 8 August 1915, the destroyer joined an anti-submarine patrol led by Admiral Bayly off the southern coast of Ireland. The ships did not see any submarines.

During the following year, as the need for destroyers in the Mediterranean Sea became more acute, the destroyer was transferred to the Fifth Destroyer Flotilla of the Mediterranean Fleet. The flotilla was busy for the remainder of the war. The introduction of convoys had improved the survivability of merchant ships, but submarine activity was still significant. At the same time, the Otranto Barrage required between 27 and 31 destroyers on station each day. On 20 January 1918, Fury was back in the United Kingdom for repairs but soon returned to Mediterranean service.

After the Armistice of 11 November 1918, the Royal Navy needed to return to a peacetime level of strength and both the number of ships and the amount of staff reduced to save money. Fury was placed in reserve at Devonport. This position did not last long. The harsh conditions of wartime operations, particularly the combination of high speed and poor weather, exacerbated by the fact that the hull was not galvanised, meant that the destroyer was worn out. Fury was sold to be broken up by Rees of Llanelly on 4 November 1921.

== Pennant numbers ==
Pennant number	Date
H42	December 1914
H35	January 1918
H67	January 1919
