= HMS Sheldrake (1911) =

Destroyer of the Royal Navy

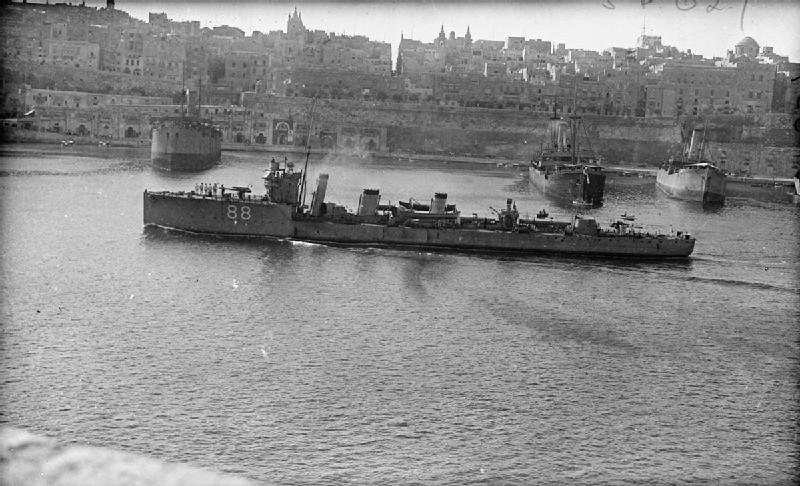
- Sheldrake entering the harbour at Malta in 1917

History

United Kingdom
- Name: Sheldrake
- Namesake: Sheldrake
- Ordered: 8 September 1909
- Builder: William Denny and Brothers, Dumbarton
- Yard number: 918
- Laid down: 15 January 1910
- Launched: 18 January 1911
- Completed: 19 May 1911
- Out of service: 9 May 1921
- Fate: Sold to be broken up

General characteristics (as built)
- Class & type: Acorn-class destroyer
- Displacement: 748 long tons (760 t) normal
- Length: 246 ft (75 m) o.a.
- Beam: 25 ft 5 in (7.7 m)
- Draught: 8 ft 6 in (2.6 m)
- Installed power: 4 Yarrow boilers 13,500 shp (10,100 kW)
- Propulsion: Parsons steam turbines, 3 shafts
- Speed: 27 kn (50 km/h; 31 mph)
- Range: 1,540 nmi (2,850 km; 1,770 mi) at 15 kn (28 km/h; 17 mph)
- Complement: 72
- Armament: 2 × single BL 4 in (102 mm) guns; 2 × single QF 12 pdr 3 in (76 mm) guns; 2 × single 21 in (533 mm) torpedo tubes

HMS Sheldrake was one of 20 Acorn-class (later H-class) destroyers built for the Royal Navy. The destroyer served in the First World War. The Acorn class were smaller than the preceding Beagle class but oil-fired and better armed. Launched in 1910, Sheldrake served with the Second Destroyer Flotilla of the Grand Fleet as an escort, transferring to Malta to serve with the Fifth Destroyer Flotilla as part of the Mediterranean Fleet in 1916. The ship once again served as an escort, protecting ships from submarines and mines, including the troopship Ivernia, as well as unsuccessfully attempting to rescue the sloop Nasturtium. After the Armistice, the destroyer was reduced to reserve before being sold to be broken up in 1921.

== Design and description ==
After the preceding coal-burning Beagle class, the Acorn-class destroyers saw a return to oil-firing. Pioneered by the Tribal class of 1905 and HMS Swift of 1907, using oil enabled a more efficient design, leading to a smaller vessel which also had increased deck space available for weaponry. Unlike previous destroyer designs, where the individual yards had been given discretion within the parameters set by the Admiralty, the Acorn class were a set, with the propulsion machinery the only major variation between the different ships. This enabled costs to be reduced. The class was later renamed H class.

Sheldrake was 240 feet (73 metres) long between perpendiculars and 246 ft (75 m) overall, with a beam of 25 ft 5 in (7.7 m) and a deep draught of 8 ft 6 in (2.6 m). Displacement was 748 long tons (838 short tons; 760 tonnes) normal and 855 long tons (958 short tons; 869 t) full load. Power was provided by Parsons steam turbines, fed by four Yarrow boilers. Parsons supplied a complex of seven turbines, a high-pressure and two low pressure for high speed, two turbines for cruising and two for running astern, driving three shafts. The high-pressure turbine drove the centre shaft, the remainder being distributed amongst two wing-shafts. Three funnels were fitted, the foremost tall and thin, the central short and thick and the aft narrow. The engines were rated at 13,500 shaft horsepower (10,100 kW) and design speed was 27 knots (50 km/h; 31 mph). On trial, Sheldrake achieved 28.3 knots (52.4 km/h; 32.6 mph). The vessel carried 170 long tons (170 t) of fuel oil which gave a range of 1,540 nautical miles (2,850 km; 1,770 mi) at a cruising speed of 15 kn (28 km/h; 17 mph).

The armament consisted of a single BL 4 in (102 mm) Mk VIII gun carried on the forecastle and another aft. Two single QF 12-pounder 3 in (76 mm) guns were mounted between the first two funnels. Two rotating 21-inch (533 mm) torpedo tubes were mounted aft of the funnels, with two reloads carried, and a searchlight fitted between the tubes. The destroyer was later modified to carry a single Vickers QF 3-pounder 2 in (47 mm) anti-aircraft gun and depth charges for anti-submarine warfare. The ship's complement was 72 officers and ratings.

== Construction and career ==
The 20 destroyers of the Acorn class were ordered by the Admiralty under the 1909–1910 Naval Programme on 8 September 1909. Sheldrake was laid down at the Dumbarton shipyard of William Denny and Brothers with the yard number 918 on 15 January 1910, launched on 18 January 1911 and completed on 19 May 1911. The ship was the sixth in Royal Navy service to be named after the sheldrake, an alternative name for the shelduck, which had been first used in 1806. On commissioning, the vessel joined the Second Destroyer Flotilla.

After the British Empire declared war on Germany at the beginning of the First World War in August 1914, the Flotilla became part of the Grand Fleet. Between 13 and 15 October, the Flotilla supported the battleships of the Grand Fleet in a practice cruise. Soon afterwards, the destroyers were deployed to Devonport to undertake escort and patrol duties, protecting merchant ships against German submarines. During December 1915, Sheldrake was posted to the Royal Navy base in Malta to operate under Rear Admiral Arthur Limpus. The destroyer escorted a troopship taking soldiers and materiel from Britain, arriving in January 1916.

Sheldrake was assigned to the Fifth Destroyer Flotilla as part of the Mediterranean Fleet. On 23 March 1916, the destroyer rescued 166 crew members and the sole passenger from the horse fodder transport Minneapolis that had been sunk by the German submarine U-35. On 27 April, Sheldrake attempted to tow the sloop HMS Nasturtium, stricken after hitting a mine. However, the poor weather and sloop's increasing list meant that the operation was unsuccessful and the ship sank the following day. For the remainder of the war, the destroyer saw service, frequently escorting troopships including Ivernia, which sailed with 2,500 troops from Alexandria to Marseille, on 26 and 27 June, protecting them from submarines and mines. Sometimes simply having an escort was sufficient to deter attack. On 2 June 1917, the ship was escorting the transport Minnetonka when U-35 approached, but could not get close enough to launch an attack due to the presence of the destroyer. On 20 January 1918, Sheldrake was attached to the Aegean Squadron, undertaking patrols as well as escort work.

After the Armistice, the Royal Navy returned to a peacetime level of strength and both the number of ships and personnel needed to be reduced to save money. Sheldrake joined 57 other destroyers in reserve at the Nore. The vessel was sold to Thos. W. Ward to the broken up at Grays, Essex, on 9 May 1921.

== Pennant numbers ==
Pennant number	Date
H88	December 1914
H0A	January 1918
F8A	September 1918
H23	January 1919
