= HMS Nereide (1910) =

Destroyer of the Royal Navy

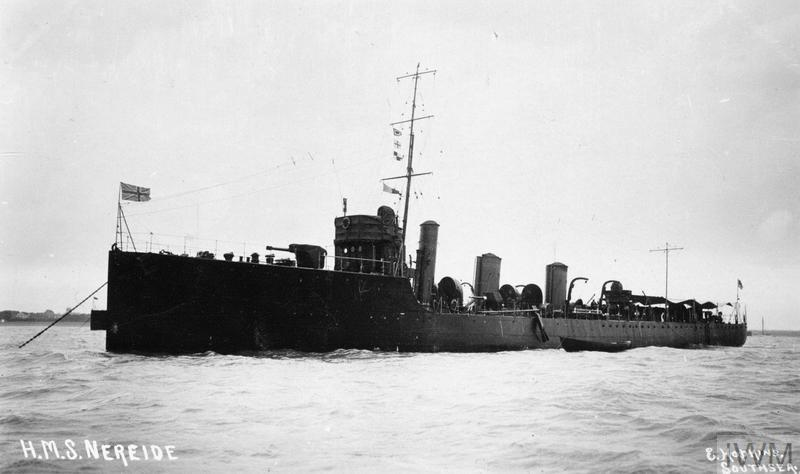
- Nereide

History

United Kingdom
- Name: Nereide
- Namesake: Nereide
- Ordered: 8 September 1909
- Builder: Hawthorne, Hebburn
- Yard number: 435
- Laid down: 3 December 1909
- Launched: 6 September 1910
- Completed: 6 April 1911
- Out of service: 1 December 1921
- Fate: Sold to be broken up

General characteristics (as built)
- Class & type: Acorn-class destroyer
- Displacement: 748 long tons (760 t) normal
- Length: 246 ft (75 m) o.a.
- Beam: 25 ft 5 in (7.7 m)
- Draught: 8 ft 6 in (2.6 m)
- Installed power: 4 Yarrow boilers 13,500 shp (10,100 kW)
- Propulsion: Parsons steam turbines, 3 shafts
- Speed: 27 kn (50 km/h; 31 mph)
- Range: 1,540 nmi (2,850 km; 1,770 mi) at 15 kn (28 km/h; 17 mph)
- Complement: 72
- Armament: 2 × single BL 4 in (102 mm) guns; 2 × single QF 12 pdr 3 in (76 mm) guns; 2 × single 21 in (533 mm) torpedo tubes

HMS Nereide was one of 20 Acorn-class (later H-class) destroyers built for the Royal Navy. The destroyer served in the First World War. The Acorn class were smaller than the preceding Beagle class but oil-fired and better armed. Launched in 1910, Nereide served with the Second Destroyer Flotilla based at the naval base at Devonport until being transferred to the Mediterranean Fleet in 1917. The vessel was employed primarily in an anti-submarine role, undertaking escort and patrol duties. In 1918, the destroyer participated in the bombardment of Durazzo. After the Armistice, the destroyer was reduced to reserve before being sold to be broken up in 1921.

== Design and description ==
After the preceding coal-burning Beagle class, the Acorn-class destroyers saw a return to oil-firing. Pioneered by the Tribal class of 1905 and HMS Swift of 1907, using oil enabled a more efficient design, leading to a smaller vessel which also had increased deck space available for weaponry. Unlike previous destroyer designs, where the individual yards had been given discretion within the parameters set by the Admiralty, the Acorn class were a set, with the propulsion machinery the only major variation between the different ships. This enabled costs to be reduced. The class was later renamed H class.

Nereide was 240 feet (73 metres) long between perpendiculars and 246 ft (75 m) overall, with a beam of 25 ft 5 in (7.7 m) and a deep draught of 8 ft 6 in (2.6 m). Displacement was 748 long tons (838 short tons; 760 tonnes) normal and 855 long tons (958 short tons; 869 t) full load. Power was provided by Parsons steam turbines, fed by four Yarrow boilers. Parsons supplied a complex of high-pressure and low pressure turbines, driving three shafts. The engines were rated at 13,500 shaft horsepower (10,100 kW) and design speed was 27 knots (50 km/h; 31 mph), although, on trial, Nereide achieved 27.8 knots (51.5 km/h; 32.0 mph). Three funnels were fitted. The vessel carried 170 long tons (170 t) of fuel oil and had a design range of 1,540 nautical miles (2,850 km; 1,770 mi) at a cruising speed of 15 kn (28 km/h; 17 mph).

The armament consisted of a single BL 4 in (102 mm) Mk VIII gun carried on the forecastle and another aft. Two single QF 12-pounder 3 in (76 mm) guns were mounted between the first two funnels. Two rotating 21-inch (533 mm) torpedo tubes were mounted aft of the funnels, with two reloads carried, and a searchlight fitted between the tubes. The destroyer was later modified to carry a single Vickers QF 3-pounder 2 in (47 mm) anti-aircraft gun and depth charges for anti-submarine warfare. The ship's complement was 72 officers and ratings.

== Construction and career ==
The 20 destroyers of the Acorn class were ordered by the Admiralty under the 1909–1910 Naval Programme on 8 September 1909. Nereide was laid down at the Dumbarton shipyard of R. & W. Hawthorn, Leslie and Company with the yard number 435 on 3 December, launched on 6 September 1910 and completed on 6 April 1911. The ship was the fifth in Royal Navy service to be given the name, the first being the captured French frigate Néréide. On commissioning, the vessel joined the Second Destroyer Flotilla. From 6 September 1911, the destroyer spent a month visiting Campbeltown.

After the British Empire declared war on Germany at the beginning of the First World War in August 1914, the Flotilla became part of the Grand Fleet. Between 13 and 15 October, the Flotilla supported the battleships of the Grand Fleet in a practice cruise. Soon afterwards, the destroyers were deployed to Devonport to undertake escort and patrol duties, protecting merchant ships against German submarines, remaining there until December 1916.

At the start of 1917, Nereide was assigned to the British Adriatic Squadron as part of the Mediterranean Fleet. On 20 January 1918, Nereide was based at Gibraltar, undertaking patrols. On 2 October, the destroyer formed part of the escort for the Bombardment of Durazzo, led by the Italian armoured cruiser San Giorgio. On 26 November, the destroyer departed for Varna in the Black Sea as part of a joint operation with the French and Italian Navies, and whilst at port in Odessa provided sanctuary to Countess Natalia Brasova along with her daughter, Natalia Sergeyevna Brasova, Princess Vyazemskaya, and her brother-in-law Aleksei Matveev, evacuating them to Constantinople.

After the Armistice, the Royal Navy needed to return to a peacetime level of strength and both the number of ships and personnel needed to be reduced to save money. In 1919, Nereide joined 48 other destroyers in reserve at Devonport. The vessel was sold to Stanlee of Dover to be broken up, on 1 December 1921.

== Pennant numbers ==
Pennant number	Date
H70	January 1919
H84	January 1918
H89	January 1918
