= HMS Larne (1910) =

Destroyer of the Royal Navy

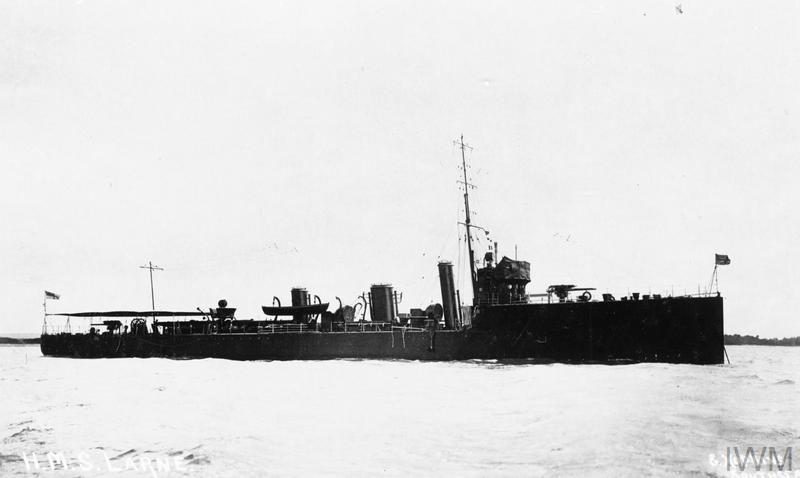
- Larne

History

United Kingdom
- Name: Larne
- Namesake: Larne
- Builder: John I. Thornycroft & Company, Woolston
- Laid down: 8 December 1909
- Launched: 23 August 1910
- Completed: February 1911
- Out of service: 9 May 1921
- Fate: Sold to be broken up

General characteristics (as built)
- Class & type: Acorn-class destroyer
- Displacement: 730 long tons (740 t) normal
- Length: 246 ft (75 m) o.a.
- Beam: 25 ft 5 in (7.7 m)
- Draught: 8 ft 6 in (2.6 m)
- Installed power: 4 Yarrow boilers, 13,500 shp (10,100 kW)
- Propulsion: Parsons steam turbines, 3 shafts
- Speed: 27 kn (50 km/h; 31 mph)
- Range: 1,540 nmi (2,850 km; 1,770 mi) at 15 kn (28 km/h; 17 mph)
- Complement: 72
- Armament: 2 × single BL 4 in (102 mm) guns; 2 × single QF 12 pdr 3 in (76 mm) guns; 2 × single 21 in (533 mm) torpedo tubes

HMS Larne was one of 20 Acorn-class (later H-class) destroyers built for the Royal Navy. The destroyer served in the First World War. The Acorn class were smaller than the preceding Beagle class but oil-fired and better armed. Launched in 1910, Larne participated in exercises that took place the following year, sustaining damage during the activity, and then a naval demonstration for Members of Parliament in 1912. At the start of the war, the ship served with the Second Destroyer Flotilla of the Grand Fleet. The destroyer undertook anti-submarine patrols around the British Isles, from Devonport to the Outer Hebrides. Despite being involved in many actions, the ship did not sink any enemy submarines. Larne ended the war in Brindisi with the Mediterranean Fleet. After the Armistice, the destroyer was placed in reserve before being sold to be broken up in 1921.

== Design and description ==
After the coal-burning Beagle class, the Acorn-class destroyers saw a return to oil-firing. Pioneered by the Tribal class of 1905 and HMS Swift of 1907, using oil enabled a more efficient design, leading to a smaller vessel which also had increased deck space available for weaponry. Unlike previous destroyer designs, where the individual yards had been given discretion within the parameters set by the Admiralty, the Acorn class were a set, with the propulsion machinery the only major variation between the different ships. This enabled costs to be reduced. The class was renamed H class in October 1913.

Larne was 240 ft (73 m) long between perpendiculars and 246 ft (75 m) overall, with a beam of 25 ft 5 in (7.7 m) and a deep draught of 8 ft 6 in (2.6 m). Displacement was 730 long tons (820 short tons; 740 tonnes) normal and 855 long tons (958 short tons; 869 t) full load. Power was provided by Parsons steam turbines, fed by four Yarrow boilers. Parsons supplied a complex of seven turbines, a high-pressure and two low pressure for high speed, two turbines for cruising and two for running astern, driving three shafts. The high-pressure turbine drove the centre shaft, the remainder being distributed amongst two wing-shafts. Three funnels were fitted, the foremost tall and thin, the central short and thick and the aft narrow. The engines were rated at 13,500 shaft horsepower (10,100 kW) and design speed was 27 knots (50 km/h; 31 mph). On trial, Larne achieved 27.9 kn (51.7 km/h; 32.1 mph). The vessel carried 170 long tons (170 t) of fuel oil which gave a range of 1,540 nautical miles (2,850 km; 1,770 mi) at a cruising speed of 15 kn (28 km/h; 17 mph).

Armament consisted of a single BL 4 in (102 mm) Mk VIII gun carried on the forecastle and another aft. Two single QF 12-pounder 3 in (76 mm) guns were mounted between the first two funnels. Two rotating 21-inch (533 mm) torpedo tubes were mounted aft of the funnels, with two reloads carried, and a searchlight fitted between the tubes. The destroyer was later modified to carry a single Vickers QF 3-pounder 2 in (47 mm) anti-aircraft gun and depth charges for anti-submarine warfare. The ship's complement was 72 officers and ratings.

== Construction and career ==
The 20 destroyers of the Acorn class were ordered by the Admiralty under the 1909–1910 Naval Programme. One of three in the class built by John I. Thornycroft & Company, Larne was laid down at the company's Woolston shipyard on 8 December 1909, launched on 23 August 1910 and completed in February 1911. The ship was the third in Royal Navy service to be named after the town of Larne in Northern Ireland.

Larne joined the Second Destroyer Flotilla. On 8 August 1911, the destroyer participated in a fleet exercise in the Irish Sea that pitted two fleets against each other. Despite being part of the winning "blue" fleet, the destroyer suffered damage as the high speed manoeuvres meant that rivets were strained so much that water entered the hull, mixing with oil in the bunkers. Larne was repaired quickly and soon back in service. On 9 July 1912, the destroyer took part in a naval demonstration organised by Winston Churchill, First Lord of the Admiralty, for Members of Parliament. Larne remained part of the Second Destroyer Flotilla in 1913.

After the British Empire declared war on Germany at the beginning of the First World War in August 1914, the flotilla became part of the Grand Fleet and the destroyers were deployed to Devonport to undertake escort duties. Following reports of submarine activity in Loch Ròg and other areas of the Outer Hebrides on 12 and 13 November, Larne and sister ship Rifleman were dispatched to the area, and found what they felt was evidence of their operation. However, this was illusionary as there were no German submarines in the area at the time. On 2 February the following year, the destroyer was part of a division led by sister ship Cameleon that was transferred to Barrow-in-Furness to provide anti-submarine patrols. The division was then commanded to sail with the dreadnought battleship Conqueror, which was travelling to Liverpool for repairs. Accompanying the battleship into Liverpool on 14 February and then travelling on to Scapa Flow, Larne was the only member of the division to manage the whole journey, Cameleon being damaged at Greenock and the remaining destroyers leaking and having to leave early.

A year later, on 14 February 1916, Larne was recommissioned at Devonport. On 28 April, while returning to Devonport from escorting merchant ships, the destroyer shot at a surfaced submarine at long range, likely to be U-45, but no hits were reported. However, the sighting was sufficient for the Admiralty to immediately halt all merchant sailing in the Irish Sea, seeing this as the only way to ensure ships were not sunk there. On 9 September, after movements had resumed, the destroyer rescued the crew of the merchant ship Pronto, sunk by submarine the night before. During 1917, the destroyer was transferred to the Mediterranean Fleet based at Brindisi. Larne was serving with the Aegean Squadron on 20 January 1918, once again acting as an escort protecting shipping against submarines.

After the Armistice, the Royal Navy returned to a peacetime level of strength and both the number of ships and personnel needed to be reduced to save money. Larne was decommissioned and place in reserve at Devonport. The vessel was sold to be broken up at Lelant to Thos. W. Ward on 9 May 1921.

== Pennant numbers ==
Pennant number	Date
H60	December 1914
H67	January 1918
H97	January 1919
