= HMS Ruby (1910) =

Destroyer of the Royal Navy

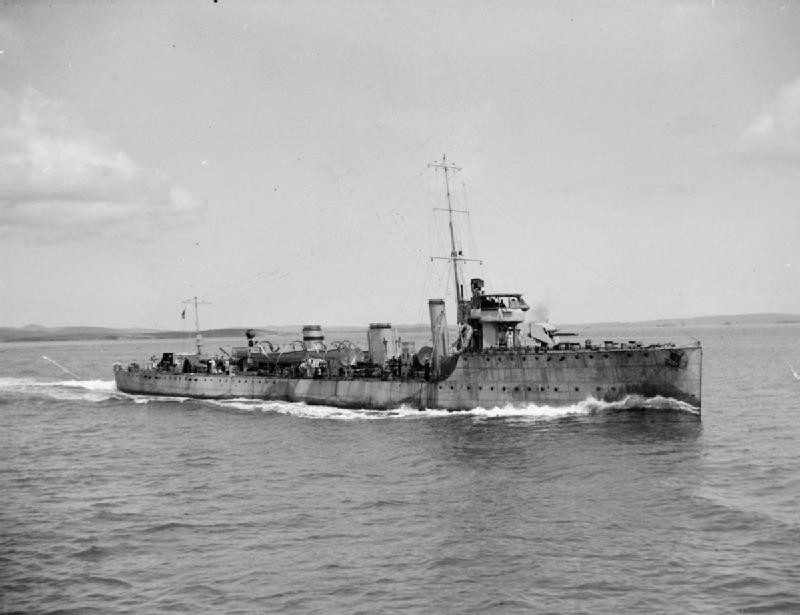
- Sister ship Redpole

History

United Kingdom
- Name: Ruby
- Builder: J. Samuel White, East Cowes
- Laid down: 15 February 1910
- Launched: 4 November 1910
- Completed: 7 April 1911
- Out of service: 9 May 1921
- Fate: Sold to be broken up

General characteristics (as built)
- Class & type: Acorn-class destroyer
- Displacement: 730 long tons (740 t) (normal); 855 long tons (869 t) (full load)
- Length: 246 ft (75 m) (o.a.); 240 ft (73 m) (p.p.)
- Beam: 25 ft 5 in (7.7 m)
- Draught: 8 ft 6 in (2.6 m)
- Installed power: 4 White-Forster boilers 13,500 shp (10,100 kW)
- Propulsion: Parsons steam turbines, 3 shafts
- Speed: 27 kn (50 km/h; 31 mph)
- Range: 1,540 nmi (2,850 km; 1,770 mi) at 15 kn (28 km/h; 17 mph)
- Complement: 72
- Armament: 2 × single BL 4 in (102 mm) guns; 2 × single QF 12 pdr 3 in (76 mm) guns; 2 × single 21 in (533 mm) torpedo tubes

HMS Ruby was one of 20 Acorn-class (later H-class) destroyers built for the Royal Navy that served in the First World War. The Acorn class were smaller than the preceding Beagle class but oil-fired and better armed. Launched in 1910, the ship served with the Second Destroyer Flotilla, joining the Grand Fleet at the start of the war. The destroyer served in escort and patrol roles, protecting merchant ships against German submarines. Despite multiple sightings and attacks, no submarine was claimed destroyed. In 1915, escort service in the Irish Sea proved too much for the destroyer's hull, which leaked and needed to be repaired. In 1916, while escorting the ocean liner Calgarian, the destroyer was again damaged attacking what was thought to be a German submarine but transpired to be wreckage from a merchant ship sunk by U-49. In 1917, the vessel was transferred to the Mediterranean Fleet, joining the Fifth Destroyer Flotilla. After the Armistice, the destroyer served in the Black Sea until being placed in reserve in 1919. Ruby was sold to be broken up in 1921.

== Design and description ==
After the preceding coal-burning Beagle class, the Acorn-class destroyer saw a return to oil-firing. Pioneered by the Tribal class of 1905 and HMS Swift of 1907, using oil enabled a more efficient design, leading to a smaller vessel which also had increased deck space available for weaponry. Unlike previous destroyer designs, where the individual shipyards had been given discretion within the parameters set by the Admiralty, the Acorn class were a fixed design, with the propulsion machinery the only major variation between the different ships. This enabled costs to be reduced. The ships were later renamed H class.

Ruby had a length of 240 feet (73 m) between perpendiculars and 246 ft (75 m) overall, with a beam of 25 ft 5 in (7.7 m) and a deep draught of 8 ft 6 in (2.6 m). Displacement was 730 long tons (820 short tons; 740 tonnes) normal and 855 long tons (869 t) full load. Power was provided by Parsons steam turbines fed by four White-Forster boilers and driving three shafts. Three funnels were fitted, the foremost tall and thin, the central short and thick and the aft narrow. The engines were rated at 13,500 shaft horsepower (10,100 kW) which gave a design speed of 27 knots (50 km/h; 31 mph). On trial, Ruby achieved 29.3 knots (54.3 km/h; 33.7 mph). The vessel carried 170 long tons (170 t) of fuel oil which gave a range of 1,540 nautical miles (2,850 km; 1,770 mi) at a cruising speed of 15 kn (28 km/h; 17 mph).

Armament consisted of two single BL 4 in (102 mm) Mk VIII guns, one carried on the forecastle and another aft. Two single QF 12-pounder 3 in (76 mm) guns were mounted between the first two funnels. Two rotating 21-inch (533 mm) torpedo tubes were mounted aft of the funnels, with two reloads carried, and a searchlight fitted between the tubes. The destroyer was later modified to carry a single Vickers QF 3-pounder 2 in (47 mm) anti-aircraft gun, and depth charges for anti-submarine warfare. The ship's complement was 72 officers and ratings.

== Construction and career ==
The 20 destroyers of the Acorn class were ordered by the Admiralty under the 1909–1910 Naval Programme. One of three in the class sourced from J. Samuel White, Ruby was laid down at the company's East Cowes shipyard on 15 February 1910 with yard number 1317 and launched on 4 November. The vessel was completed on 7 April 1911, the tenth ship in Royal Navy service to be given the name, the first recorded use being in 1596. On commissioning, Ruby joined the Second Destroyer Flotilla. The flotilla was attached to the First Fleet.

After the British Empire declared war on Germany at the beginning of the First World War in August 1914, the Flotilla became part of the Grand Fleet based at Scapa Flow. On 23 August, while sailing with the Fleet on an exercise, the destroyer reported seeing a submarine, but no other contact was made. On 18 September, the Flotilla was briefly deployed to the Kent coast, between Dover and Margate. Between 13 and 15 October, the Flotilla supported the battleships of the Grand Fleet in a practice cruise. Soon afterwards, the destroyers were deployed to Devonport to undertake escort and patrol duties, protecting merchant ships against German submarines. As February 1915 unfolded, the destroyer was detached to Barrow-in-Furness. From there, Ruby joined other destroyers under the command of Cameleon in escorting merchant ships in the Irish Sea. The operation was arduous and led to the ship's hull leaking and having to dock on 14 February, eventually returning to Scapa Flow four days later. On 7 May, the destroyer was involved in an unsuccessful search for the submarine U-27 off the Butt of Lewis. Similarly, on 28 August, the flotilla took part in an anti-submarine patrol in the North Sea, accompanied by battleships and cruisers. Again, this was unsuccessful at destroying any submarines.

The destroyer was subsequently attached to the Admiral of Minesweeping based at Devonport. The Devonport-based destroyers were responsible for escorting merchant ships travelling from North and South America, Gibraltar, Dakar and the Cape. Some of these carried very valuable cargo. For example, on 31 January 1917 the destroyer formed part of the escort for the ocean liner Calgarian that was carrying gold to Halifax, Nova Scotia. While escorting the vessel again a month later, Ruby rammed debris of a ship sunk by U-49, thinking it was a submarine, being severely damaged in the process. Meanwhile, the demand from the merchant marine for escorts was increasing. By April, between 120 and 140 vessels were needing escort as they arrived or departed from UK ports. However, on 28 May 1917, the repaired Ruby was left with only sister ship Brisk as an ally to protect the myriad of vessels passing through, and as a consequence seven ships were sunk in the next two days. On 24 July, while patrolling off the coast of Plymouth, the destroyer attacked a German submarine with depth charges. A similar attack took place off Lough Swilly on 7 August. In both cases, once again, no hits were reported.

Soon afterwards, the destroyer was transferred to the Fifth Destroyer Flotilla of the Mediterranean Fleet. On 20 January 1918, Ruby was based at the naval base in Malta undergoing refit. The introduction of convoys had improved the survivability of merchant ships, but submarine activity was still a significant threat. At the same time, the Otranto Barrage required between 27 and 31 destroyers on station each day, so there was substantial work to be done and the destroyer was soon back in service. Although the Armistice of 11 November ended fighting on the Western Front, in the Black Sea, the Russian Revolution meant that the warship was still required to serve. On 25 November, the destroyer joined a large British naval flotilla that sailed to Sevastapol. On 15 December, Ruby arrived at Ismid escorting the Russian destroyer Derzky. The Russian vessel was commissioned on 24 December 1919 in Malta but was not handed to a Russian crew as planned due to a lack of personnel.

In the meantime, the Armistice meant that the Royal Navy needed to return to a peacetime level of strength and both the number of ships and the amount of staff reduced to save money. Ruby was placed in reserve at Nore. This position did not last long. The harsh conditions of wartime operations, particularly the combination of high speed and poor weather, exacerbated by the fact that the hull was not galvanised, meant that the destroyer was worn out. Ruby was sold to be broken up at Milford Haven to Thos. W. Ward on 9 May 1921.

== Pennant numbers ==
Pennant number	Date
H85	December 1914
H98	January 1918
H22	January 1919
