= HMS Staunch (1910) =

Destroyer of the Royal Navy

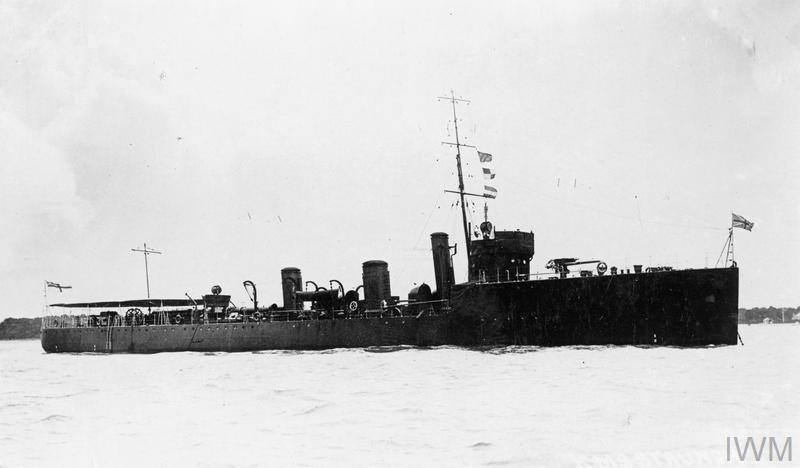
- A broadside view of Staunch

History

United Kingdom
- Name: Staunch
- Builder: William Denny and Brothers, Dumbarton
- Yard number: 920
- Laid down: 15 January 1910
- Launched: 29 October 1910
- Completed: 17 March 1911
- Fate: Sunk, on 11 November 1917

General characteristics (as built)
- Class & type: Acorn-class destroyer
- Displacement: 748 long tons (760 t) normal
- Length: 246 ft (75 m) o.a.
- Beam: 25 ft 5 in (7.7 m)
- Draught: 8 ft 6 in (2.6 m)
- Installed power: 4 Yarrow boilers 13,500 shp (10,100 kW)
- Propulsion: Parsons steam turbines, 3 shafts
- Speed: 27 kn (50 km/h; 31 mph)
- Range: 1,540 nmi (2,850 km; 1,770 mi) at 15 kn (28 km/h; 17 mph)
- Complement: 72
- Armament: 2 × single BL 4 in (102 mm) guns; 2 × single QF 12 pdr (3 in (76 mm)) guns; 2 × single 21 in (533 mm) torpedo tubes

HMS Staunch was one of 20 Acorn-class (later H-class) destroyers built for the Royal Navy. The destroyer served in the First World War. The Acorn class were smaller than the preceding Beagle class but oil-fired and better armed. Launched in 1910, Staunch acted as escort for the royal yacht Britannia at the Cowes Regatta the following year. At the start of the First World War, the vessel served with the Second Destroyer Flotilla of the Grand Fleet as an escort, transferring to the Fifth Destroyer Flotilla as part of the Mediterranean Fleet in 1915. As the year closed, Staunch assisted in the evacuation of troops at the end of the Gallipoli campaign. Despite the conditions, the destroyer managed to transport almost an entire battalion of the Worcestershire Regiment to safety. In 1917, while moored off the coast of Deir al-Balah supporting the monitors Raglan, M16 and M29, Staunch was torpedoed by the German submarine U-38. The destroyer sank, with eight sailors killed.

== Design and description ==
After the preceding coal-burning Beagle class, the Acorn-class destroyers saw a return to oil-firing, as pioneered by the Tribal class of 1905, which enabled the vessels to be smaller yet with increased deck space available for weaponry. The class was later renamed the H class.

Staunch was 240 feet (73 metres) long between perpendiculars and 246 ft (75 m) overall, with a beam of 25 ft 5 in (7.7 m) and a deep draught of 8 ft 6 in (2.6 m). Displacement was 748 long tons (760 tonnes) normal and 855 long tons (869 t) full load. Power was provided by Parsons steam turbines, fed by four Yarrow boilers. Parsons supplied a set of direct-drive turbines with seven casings, three for high speed, two for cruising and two for running astern. Power was transmitted through three shafts, a single high-speed turbine driving a centre shaft and the remainder distributed amongst two wing-shafts. Three funnels were fitted. The engines were rated at 13,500 shaft horsepower (10,100 kW) and design speed was 27 knots (50 km/h; 31 mph). The vessel carried 170 long tons (190 short tons; 170 t) of fuel oil which gave a range of 1,540 nautical miles (2,850 km; 1,770 mi) at a cruising speed of 15 knots (28 km/h; 17 mph).

Armament consisted of two single BL 4 in (102 mm) Mk VIII guns, one carried on the forecastle and another aft. Two single QF 12-pounder 3 in (76 mm) guns were mounted between the first two funnels. Two rotating 21-inch (533 mm) torpedo tubes were mounted aft of the funnels, with two reloads carried, and a searchlight fitted between the tubes. The destroyer was later modified to carry a single Vickers QF 3-pounder 2 in (47 mm) anti-aircraft gun and depth charges for anti-submarine warfare. The ship's complement was 72 officers and ratings.

== Construction and career ==
The 20 destroyers of the Acorn class were ordered by the Admiralty under the 1909–1910 Naval Programme. Unlike previous destroyer designs, where the individual yards had been given discretion within the parameters set by the Admiralty, the Acorn class were a set, with the machinery the only major variation between the different ships, enabling costs to be reduced. Staunch was laid down at the Dumbarton shipyard of William Denny and Brothers with the yard number 920 on 15 January 1910, launched on 29 October and completed on 17 March. The ship was the fifth in Royal Navy service given the name staunch. The vessel initially joined the Fourth Destroyer Flotilla. On 5 August 1911, the destroyer escorted the royal yacht Britannia at the Cowes Regatta. Staunch subsequently joined the Second Destroyer Flotilla.

After the British Empire declared war on Germany at the beginning of the First World War in August 1914, the flotilla became part of the Grand Fleet. Between 13 and 15 October, the flotilla supported the battleships of the Grand Fleet in a training exercise. Soon afterwards, the destroyers were deployed to Devonport to undertake escort and patrol duties, protecting merchant ships against German submarines. January 1915 found the vessel still attached to the Second Destroyer Flotilla of the Grand Fleet. On 28 August 1915, the flotilla took part in an anti-submarine patrol, accompanied by battleships and cruisers, but this was unsuccessful at destroying any submarines. However, towards the end of the year, the destroyer was detached from the Grand Fleet.

Leaving Devonport on 13 November, Staunch sailed to the Mediterranean Sea. The ship was attached to the Fifth Destroyer Flotilla as part of the Mediterranean Fleet. Within months, the destroyer was deployed to support the end of the Gallipoli campaign. Royal Navy vessels had successfully removed a large force from the peninsular, but there remained 37,500 troops on 29 December left on the beaches. The Navy organised the evacuation of 22,500 troops, but the combination of weather and geography meant that there were still 15,000 that were left ashore. It was not until 9 January 1916 that the destroyer was able to approach one of the hulks that lay offshore and was able to save the majority of a battalion of the Worcestershire Regiment.

On 30 October 1917, the destroyer formed part of the support for the monitor Raglan in bombarding troops of the Ottoman Empire stationed north of Gaza. The monitor was joined by HMS M15 and HMS M29, and three French destroyers and the ships moored off the coast of Deir al-Balah, but, on 10 November, the German U-boat U-38, led by Lieutenant Hans Wendlandt, arrived in the area. Remained at periscope depth, Wendlandt monitored the flotilla until, on the following day, he found a gap between the anti-submarine nets and the coast. Shortly after 17:30, he launched torpedoes at M15 and Staunch, sinking both ships. Eight sailors aboard Staunch were killed but the submarine escaped unscathed.

== Pennant numbers ==
Pennant number	Date
H89	September 1915
H2A	1917
