= HMS Goldfinch (1910) =

Destroyer of the Royal Navy

History

United Kingdom
- Name: Goldfinch
- Builder: Fairfield Shipbuilding and Engineering Company, Govan, Glasgow
- Laid down: 23 February 1910
- Launched: 12 July 1910
- Commissioned: February 1911
- Fate: Wrecked, 19 February 1915; Broken up for scrap, April 1919

General characteristics
- Class & type: Acorn-class destroyer
- Displacement: 778 long tons (790 t)
- Length: 246 ft (75.0 m)
- Beam: 25 ft 8 in (7.8 m)
- Draught: 8 ft 6 in (2.6 m)
- Installed power: 4 × Yarrow boilers; 13,500 shp (10,100 kW)
- Propulsion: 2 × steam turbines; 2 × shafts
- Speed: 27 knots (50 km/h; 31 mph)
- Complement: 72
- Armament: 2 × single 4 in (102 mm) guns; 2 × single 12 pdr (3 in (76 mm)) guns; 2 × single 21 in (533 mm) torpedo tubes

HMS Goldfinch was an Acorn-class destroyer built for the Royal Navy. Completed in 1911, the ship spent her career in home waters and participated in the First World War as part of the Grand Fleet. She was wrecked in fog on Start Point, Sanday, one of the northern Orkney Isles, on the night of 18–19 February 1915. Her wreck was broken up for scrap in April 1919.

== Description ==
Ordered as part of the 1909–1910 Naval Programme, the Acorn-class ships were improved versions of the earlier Beagle class. The ships displaced 778 long tons (790 t) at normal load and 873 long tons (887 t) at deep load. They had an overall length of 246 feet (75.0 m), a beam of 25 feet 8 inches (7.8 m) and a draught of 9 feet 2 inches (2.8 m). The ship was powered by a single Parsons steam turbine set which drove three propeller shafts using steam provided by four Yarrow boilers. The turbine was rated at 13,500 shaft horsepower (10,100 kW) and was intended to give a speed of not less than 26 knots (48 km/h; 30 mph). During her sea trials Goldfinch reached 28.1 knots (52.0 km/h; 32.3 mph) from 14,537 shp (10,840 kW). The Acorns carried a maximum of 153 long tons (155 t) of fuel oil in wartime that gave them a range of 1,620 nautical miles (3,000 km; 1,860 mi) at 15 knots (28 km/h; 17 mph). Their crew numbered 70 officers and ratings.

The ships were armed with a pair of BL 4-inch (102 mm) Mk VIII gun in single mounts, one on the forecastle and the other on the stern and a pair of quick-firing (QF) 12-pounder (3-inch (76 mm)) guns, one on each broadside between the two forward funnels. Their torpedo armament consisted of two rotating torpedo tubes for 21-inch (533 mm) torpedoes amidships.

== Construction and service ==
Goldfinch was laid down at Fairfield Shipbuilding and Engineering Company's Govan, Glasgow shipyard on 23 February 1910 and was launched on 12 July 1910 and was completed in February 1911.

On commissioning, Goldfinch joined the Second Destroyer Flotilla. On the night of 11 March 1911, a fire broke out in the radio room of Goldfinch while alongside at Devonport, destroying the radio equipment. Goldfinch remained part of the Second Flotilla in February 1913.

On the outbreak of the First World War in August 1914, the 2nd Destroyer Flotilla, including Goldfinch, joined the newly established Grand Fleet. Goldfinch ran aground on Start Point, Sanday in the Orkney Islands in fog on the night of 18/19 February 1915. While none of her crew was killed, Goldfinch was wrecked. The ship's remains were sold for scrap in 1919.

== Bibliography ==
- Colledge, J. J.; Warlow, Ben (2006) [1969]. Ships of the Royal Navy: The Complete Record of All Fighting Ships of the Royal Navy from the 15th Century to the Present (3rd Rev ed.). London: Chatham Publishing. ISBN 978-1-86176-281-8. OCLC 67375475.
- Friedman, Norman (2009). British Destroyers: From Earliest Days to the Second World War. Barnsley, UK: Seaforth Publishing. ISBN 978-1-84832-049-9.
- Gardiner, Robert & Gray, Randal, eds. (1985). Conway's All The World's Fighting Ships 1906–1921. London: Conway Maritime Press. ISBN 0-85177-245-5.
- Jellicoe, John (1919). The Grand Fleet 1914–16: Its Creation, Development and Work. London: Cassell and Company. OCLC 859842281.
- Kemp, Paul (1999). The Admiralty Regrets: British Warship Losses of the 20th Century. Stroud, UK: Sutton Publishing Limited. ISBN 0-7509-1567-6.
- Manning, T. D. (1961). The British Destroyer. London: Putnam. OCLC 6470051.
- March, Edgar J. (1966). British Destroyers: A History of Development, 1892–1953; Drawn by Admiralty Permission From Official Records & Returns, Ships' Covers & Building Plans. London: Seeley Service. OCLC 164893555.
