= Arthur Peters (Royal Navy officer) =

Royal Navy Admiral (1888-1979)

Admiral Sir Arthur Peters KCB DSC
- Born: 1 June 1888; Kensington, London
- Died: 23 September 1979 (aged 91); Sidmouth, Devon, England
- Military career
- Allegiance: United Kingdom
- Branch: Royal Navy
- Service years: 1903–1945
- Rank: Admiral
- Commands: HMS Erebus; HMS Delphinium; HMS Southampton
- Conflicts: World War I World War II
- Awards: Knight Commander of the Order of the Bath; Distinguished Service Cross

Admiral Sir Arthur Malcolm Peters KCB DSC (1 June 1888 – 23 September 1979) was a Royal Navy officer who became Naval Secretary.

== Early life ==
Peters was born in Kensington, the only surviving son of Major-General William Henry Brooke Peters and Hon. Rosalinda Catherine Sophia Clifford-Butler, daughter of James Fitzwalter Clifford-Butler, 15th/25th Baron Dunboyne.

== Naval career ==
Educated at Stubbington House School in Fareham and Britannia Royal Naval College, Peters joined the Royal Navy in 1903. He served in World War I and took part in the Battle of Heligoland Bight in 1914, the Battle of Dogger Bank in 1915 and the Battle of Jutland in 1916. He was appointed Commander of the training ship HMS Erebus in 1927, Commander of the sloop HMS Delphinium in 1930 and then Senior Naval Officer, West Coast of Africa before given command of the cruiser HMS Southampton in 1936.

He served in World War II as Commodore-in-Charge, of Naval Establishments, Hong Kong from 1939 and as Naval Secretary from 1941 to 1942 before becoming Flag Officer, West Africa in 1943 and retiring in 1945.

Military offices
Preceded by Neville Syfret	Naval Secretary; 1941–1942	Succeeded by Frederick Dalrymple-Hamilton
