= Acorn-class destroyer =

RN destroyer class

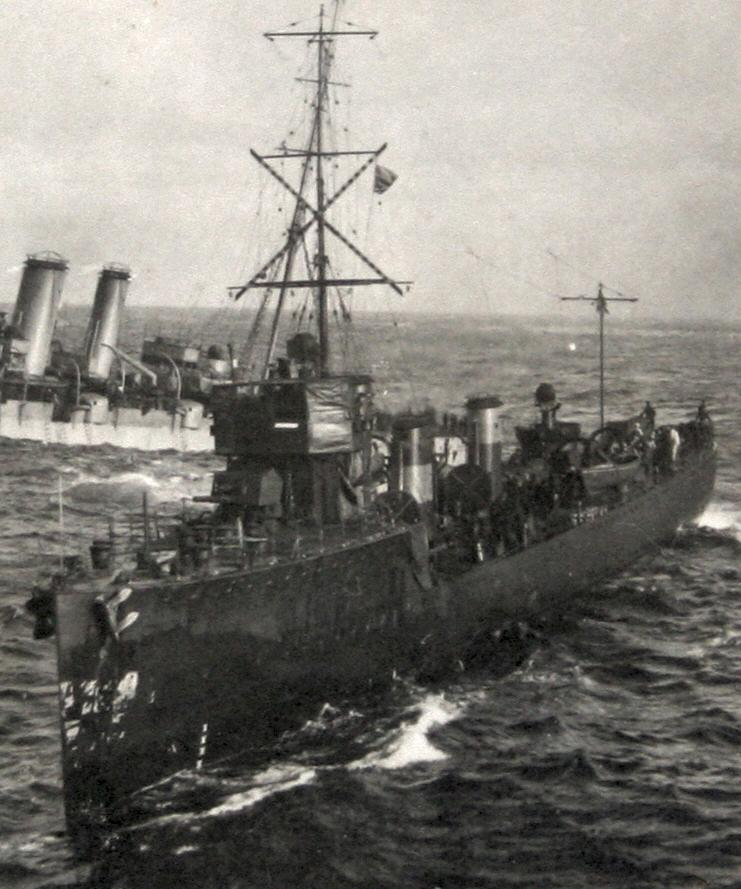
- HMS Fury

Class overview
- Builders: John Brown and Company; William Denny & Brothers; Fairfield Shipbuilding & Engineering Company; R. W. Hawthorn Leslie & Company; Swan Hunter & Wigham Richardson; A. & J. Inglis; John I. Thornycroft & Company; J. Samuel White & Company
- Operators: Royal Navy; Imperial Japanese Navy
- Preceded by: Beagle class
- Succeeded by: Acheron class
- Built: 1910–1911
- In commission: 1910–1921
- Completed: 20
- Lost: 3

General characteristics
- Type: Destroyer
- Displacement: 730 to 780 tons
- Length: 246 ft 6 in (75.13 m)
- Beam: 25 ft 6 in (7.77 m)
- Draught: 7 ft (2.1 m)–10 ft (3.0 m)
- Propulsion: Oil-fired boilers; 3 shaft steam turbines; 13,500 shp (10,067 kW)
- Speed: 27 knots (50 km/h)
- Endurance: 170 tons oil
- Complement: 72
- Armament: 2 × BL 4-inch (102 mm) L/40 Mark VIII guns, mounting P Mark V; 2 × QF 12-pounder 12 cwt Mark I mounting P Mark I; 2 × 21-inch (533 mm) torpedo tubes

The Acorn class (officially redesignated the H class in 1913) was a class of twenty destroyers of the Royal Navy all built under the 1909-1910 Programme, and completed between 1910 and 1911. The Acorns served during World War I.

== Design ==
After the coal-burning Beagle class of the 1908–1909 shipbuilding programme, the British Admiralty decided to return to oil-fuelled machinery, as pioneered in the Tribal class of 1905 and HMS Swift of 1907, for the destroyers to be built under the 1909–1910 programme, which became the Acorn class. This change allowed a smaller vessel than the Beagles even with an increase in armament.

While the detailed design of earlier destroyer classes was left to the builders resulting in individual ships differing considerably, this changed for the Acorns, where a standard hull design was used, allowing more shipyards to bid for orders, thus driving down costs, while reducing the time and effort required for the Admiralty to check and approve each builder's designs. Machinery design, however, was still left to the builders, although it had to fit into the space allowed in the standard design. They had a reasonably uniform appearance, with three funnels, a tall, thin fore funnel, a short, thick central and a short narrow after stack.

The ships were 240 feet 0 inches (73.15 m) long between perpendiculars and 246 feet 0 inches (74.98 m) overall, with a beam of 25 feet 3 inches (7.70 m) and a draught of between 7 feet 4 1/2 inches (2.248 m) and 8 feet 10 inches (2.69 m) depending on load. Displacement was 760 long tons (770 t) normal and 855 long tons (869 t) full load. Nineteen of the twenty ships of the Acorn class had three propeller shafts driven by Parsons steam turbines, fed by four boilers (White-Forster boilers in the three J. Samuel White-built ships, (Redpole, Rifleman and Ruby), Yarrow boilers in the remaining ships), with the boiler out-takes routed to three funnels. The remaining ship of the class, the John Brown & Company-built Brisk, had a two shaft arrangement powered by Brown-Curtis impulse turbines. The ships were required to reach 27 knots (50 km/h; 31 mph), the same speed as the Beagle class, which was expected to need 13,500 shaft horsepower (10,100 kW). (Note: The power needed to reach the specified speed was greater than expected in some ships, with Acorn needing 15,072 shaft horsepower (11,239 kW) during sea trials to reach 27.335 knots (50.624 km/h; 31.457 mph). Other ships were faster, with Larne reaching 28.723 knots (53.195 km/h; 33.054 mph) with 14,900 shaft horsepower (11,100 kW) and Ruby reaching 30.335 knots (56.180 km/h; 34.909 mph) with 16,776 shaft horsepower (12,510 kW).) The ships had a crew of 72 officers and men.

The revised machinery layout freed up deck space, allowing heavier armament to be carried. Gun armament consisted of two 4-inch (102 mm) BL Mk VIII guns, (Note: The abbreviation BL stood for Breech Loading. In British use it also indicated that the gun used a bagged charge, with QF (Quick Firing) meaning that the gun used a charge enclosed in a metal cartridge case.) one on the ship's forecastle and one aft, and two 12-pounder (76 mm) QF 12 cwt guns (Note: "Cwt" is the abbreviation for hundredweight, 12 cwt referring to the weight of the gun.) carried in the waist position between the first two funnels. Unlike the Beagles, the forecastle gun was not raised on a bandstand, as it was felt that in heavy seas this generated additional spray. As with the Beagles, torpedo armament consisted of two 21-inch (533 mm) torpedo tubes, with two reload torpedoes carried, although the tubes were longer, allowing more modern torpedoes to be carried. The torpedo tubes were aft of the funnels, mounted singly with a searchlight position between them. Wartime modifications included the addition of a 3-pounder (47 mm) Vickers anti-aircraft gun and depth charges.

The Acorns were followed, in the 1910-11 Programme, by the Acheron class (later known as the 'I' class).

== Service ==
HMS Hope, c. 1914

On commissioning, between December 1910 and February 1912, the ships of the class joined the 2nd Destroyer Flotilla of the Royal Navy's Home Fleet, replacing River-class destroyers. They were officially redesignated the H class in October 1913 as part of a general re-designation of the Royal Navy's destroyers.

The ships of the class remained members of the 2nd Flotilla on the outbreak of the First World War, when the flotilla became part of the Grand Fleet. Some ships of the class were sent to the Mediterranean in 1915, with all surviving ships eventually being transferred there. Two of the class (Minstrel and Nemesis) were loaned to the Imperial Japanese Navy in 1917, being renamed Sendan and Kanran, and were returned in 1919. Three ships of the class were lost during the war, one (Goldfinch) ran aground at Start Point in Sanday, one of the Orkney Islands, in 1915, while the other two ships, Comet and Staunch, were sunk by enemy submarines in the Mediterranean.

Following the end of the war, the Royal Navy quickly disposed of large numbers of older ships, including the Acorn class. All remaining ships of the class had been sold for scrap by the end of 1921.

== Ships ==
Name	Builder	Laid down	Launch date	Completed	Fate
Acorn	John Brown and Company, Clydebank	12 January 1910	1 July 1910	December 1910.	Sold for breaking up 29 November 1921.
Alarm	John Brown and Company, Clydebank	7 February 1910	29 August 1910	March 1911.	Sold for breaking up 9 May 1921.
Brisk	John Brown and Company, Clydebank	21 February 1910	20 September 1910	June 1911.	Sold for breaking up 15 November 1921.
Cameleon	Fairfield Shipbuilding & Engineering Company, Govan	6 December 1909,	2 June 1910	December 1910.	Sold for breaking up 15 November 1921.
Comet	Fairfield Shipbuilding & Engineering Company, Govan	1 February 1910	23 June 1910	June 1911.	Torpedoed and sunk by Austrian U-boat in the Mediterranean 6 August 1918.
Fury	A. & J. Inglis, Pointhouse, Glasgow	3 March 1910	25 April 1911	February 1912.	Sold for breaking up 4 November 1921.
Goldfinch	Fairfield Shipbuilding & Engineering Company, Govan	23 February 1910	12 July 1910	February 1911.	Wrecked in fog on Start Point, Sanday, Orkney on the night of 18–19 February 1915.
Hope	Swan Hunter & Wigham Richardson, Wallsend	9 December 1909	6 September 1910	March 1911.	Sold for breaking up at Malta in February 1920.
Larne	John I. Thornycroft & Company, Woolston	8 December 1909	23 August 1910	February 1911.	Sold for breaking up 9 May 1921.
Lyra	John I. Thornycroft & Company, Woolston	8 December 1909	4 October 1910	February 1911.	Sold for breaking up 9 May 1921.
Martin	John I. Thornycroft & Company, Woolston	21 December 1909	15 December 1910	March 1911.	Sold for breaking up 21 August 1920 at Malta.
Minstrel	John I. Thornycroft & Company, Woolston	11 March 1910	2 February 1911	May 1911.	Loaned to Imperial Japanese Navy from June 1917 to 1919 as Sendan (栴檀). Sold for breaking up 1 December 1921.
Nemesis	R. W. Hawthorn Leslie & Company, Hebburn	26 November 1909	9 August 1910	March 1911	Loaned to Imperial Japanese Navy from June 1917 to 1919 as Kanran (橄欖). Sold for breaking up 26 November 1921.
Nereide	R. W. Hawthorn Leslie & Company, Hebburn	3 December 1909	6 September 1910	March 1911.	Sold for breaking up 1 December 1921.
Nymphe	R. W. Hawthorn Leslie & Company, Hebburn	8 December 1909	31 January 1911	May 1911	Sold for breaking up 9 May 1921.
Redpole	J. Samuel White & Company, Cowes	10 December 1909	24 June 1910	February 1911	Sold for breaking up 9 May 1921.
Rifleman	J. Samuel White & Company, Cowes	21 December 1909	22 August 1910	March 1911.	Sold for breaking up 9 May 1921.
Ruby	J. Samuel White & Company, Cowes	15 February 1910	4 November 1910	7 April 1911.	Sold for breaking up 9 May 1921.
Sheldrake	William Denny & Brothers, Dumbarton	15 January 1910	18 January 1911	19 May 1911.	Sold for breaking up 9 May 1921.
Staunch	William Denny & Brothers, Dumbarton	15 January 1910	29 October 1910	March 1911.	Torpedoed and sunk by German U-boat SM UC-38 off Gaza, Palestine 11 November 1917.

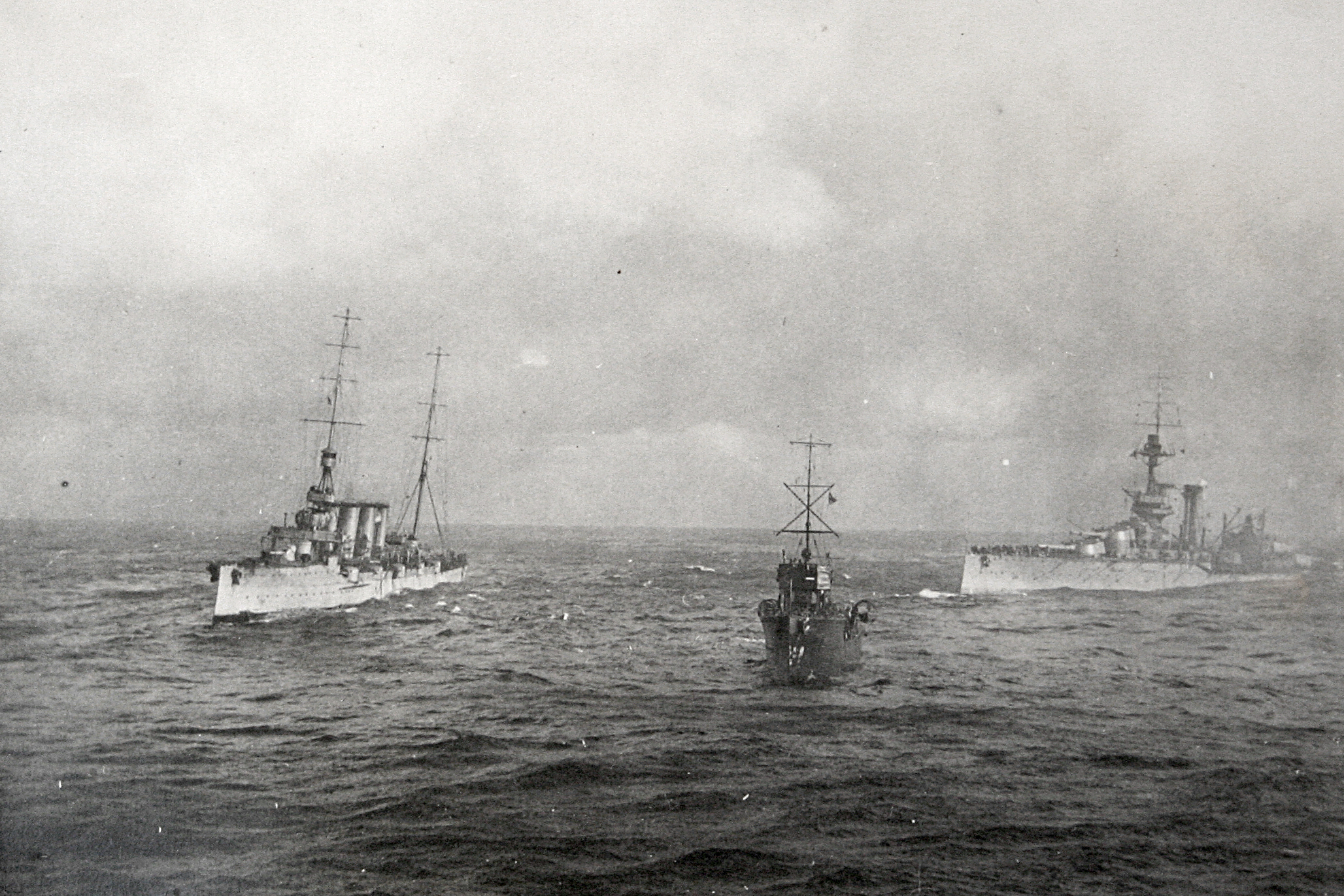
Fury (dark, centre picture) and Liverpool try to take the sinking battleship Audacious in tow. The view is from the passenger areas of the liner Olympic, 27 October 1914
