= 2nd Division (Royal Navy) =

- Active: March 1909–May 1912
- Country: United Kingdom
- Branch: Royal Navy
- Type: Division

The 2nd Division was a naval formation of the British Home Fleet it was formed before First World War in March 1909 and was active until May 1912.

== History ==
In March 1909 following a re-organisation of the British Fleet the Channel Fleet was absorbed by the Home Fleet, while the former Channel Fleet became the Home Fleet's first and second divisions. These new divisions were made up of an 8-12 ship battle squadron that included either dreadnought battleships or pre-dreadnought battleships all remaining components of the former Home Fleet as it then stood became the third and fourth divisions that was a single command under a vice-admiral. The third and fourth division was assigned to major home commands as a reserve force.

The 2nd Battle Squadron of the 2nd Division contained ten to twelve older battleships, the 2nd Cruiser Squadron was formed using armored cruisers whilst the 2nd Destroyer Flotilla had four scout cruiser leaders assigned to it during its tenure plus 21 other destroyers of different classes.

== Vice-admirals commanding 2nd Division ==
Post holders included:

	Rank	Flag	Name	Term
Vice-admirals commanding 2nd Division
1	Vice-Admiral	Vice-Admiral - Royal Navy	Sir Archibald Berkeley Milne	24 March 1909 - 9 August 1910
2	Vice-Admiral	Vice-Admiral - Royal Navy	Sir George A. Callaghan	9 August 1910 - 19 October 1911
3	Vice-Admiral	Rear-Admiral - Royal Navy	Sir John R. Jellicoe	19 October 1911 - May 1912

== Rear admirals in the Second Division ==
Post holders included:

	Rank	Flag	Name	Term
Rear admirals in the Second Division
1	Rear-Admiral	Rear-Admiral - Royal Navy	James Startin	24 March 1909 - 9 October 1909
2	Rear-Admiral	Rear-Admiral - Royal Navy	Edward E. Bradford	9 October 1909 - 19 October 1910
3	Rear-Admiral	Rear-Admiral - Royal Navy	George E. Patey	19 October 1910 - 19 October 1911
4	Rear-Admiral	Rear-Admiral - Royal Navy	Herbert G. King-Hall	19 October 1911 -May 1912

== Components ==
Included:

	Unit	Dates	Notes
1	2nd Battle Squadron, 2nd Division		(10-12, pre-dreadnought battleships)
2	2nd Cruiser Squadron		( 6, armored cruisers )
3	1st Destroyer Flotilla		(4 scout cruiser, leaders & 21 destroyers )
4	2nd Destroyer Flotilla	February 1909 to May 1912	forming in Feb
