= HMS Redpole (1910) =

Destroyer of the Royal Navy

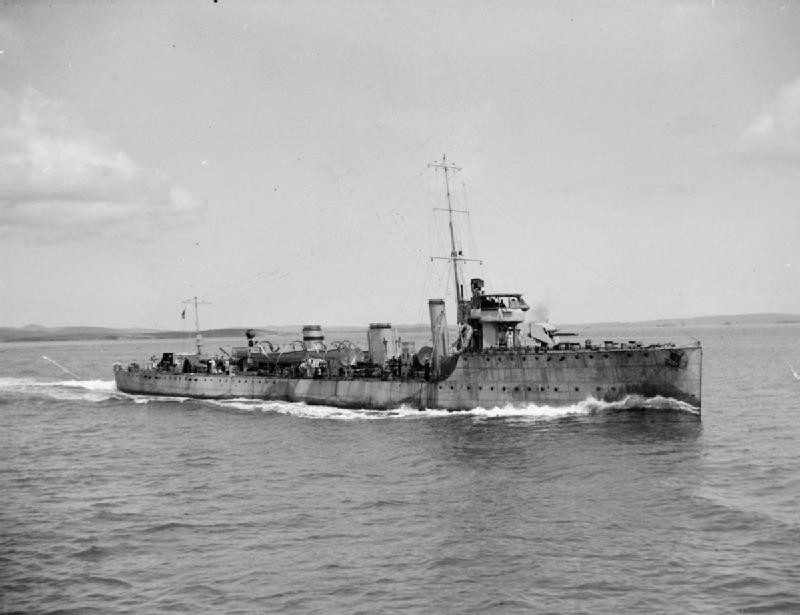
- Redpole

History

United Kingdom
- Name: Redpole
- Namesake: Redpole
- Builder: J. Samuel White, East Cowes
- Laid down: 10 December 1909
- Launched: 24 June 1910
- Completed: February 1911
- Out of service: 9 May 1921
- Fate: Sold to be broken up

General characteristics (as built)
- Class & type: Acorn-class destroyer
- Displacement: 730 long tons (740 t) (normal); 855 long tons (869 t) (full load)
- Length: 246 ft (75 m) (o.a.); 240 ft (73 m) (p.p.)
- Beam: 25 ft 5 in (7.7 m)
- Draught: 8 ft 6 in (2.6 m)
- Installed power: 4 White-Forster boilers 13,500 shp (10,100 kW)
- Propulsion: Parsons steam turbines, 3 shafts
- Speed: 27 kn (50 km/h; 31 mph)
- Range: 1,540 nmi (2,850 km; 1,770 mi) at 15 kn (28 km/h; 17 mph)
- Complement: 72
- Armament: 2 × single BL 4 in (102 mm) guns; 2 × single QF 12 pdr 3 in (76 mm) gun; 2 × single 21 in (533 mm) torpedo tubes

HMS Redpole was one of 20 Acorn-class (later H-class) destroyers built for the Royal Navy that served in the First World War. The Acorn class were smaller than the preceding Beagle class but oil-fired and better armed. Launched in 1910, the ship served with the Second Destroyer Flotilla, joining the Grand Fleet at the start of the war, and was transferred to the Mediterranean Fleet in 1915, joining the Fifth Destroyer Flotilla. Employed as an escort, the ship also undertook other duties, including rescuing the Italian destroyer Benedetto Cairoli in 1918. Redpole ended the war in Gibraltar. After the Armistice, the destroyer was placed in reserve before being sold to be broken up in 1921.

== Design and description ==
After the preceding coal-burning Beagle class, the Acorn-class destroyer saw a return to oil-firing. Pioneered by the Tribal class of 1905 and HMS Swift of 1907, using oil enabled a more efficient design, leading to a smaller vessel which also had increased deck space available for weaponry. Unlike previous destroyer designs, where the individual yards had been given discretion within the parameters set by the Admiralty, the Acorn class were a set, with the propulsion machinery the only major variation between the different ships. This enabled costs to be reduced. The class was later renamed H class.

Redpole had a length of 240 feet (73 m) between perpendiculars and 246 ft (75 m) overall, with a beam of 25 ft 5 in (7.7 m) and a deep draught of 8 ft 6 in (2.6 m). Displacement was 730 long tons (820 short tons; 740 tonnes) normal and 855 long tons (869 t) full load. Power was provided by Parsons steam turbines fed by four White-Forster boilers and driving three shafts. Three funnels were fitted, the foremost tall and thin, the central short and thick and the aft narrow. The engines were rated at 13,500 shaft horsepower (10,100 kW) which gave a design speed of 27 knots (50 km/h; 31 mph). On trial, Redpole achieved 28.7 knots (53.2 km/h; 33.0 mph). The vessel carried 170 long tons (170 t) of fuel oil which gave a range of 1,540 nautical miles (2,850 km; 1,770 mi) at a cruising speed of 15 kn (28 km/h; 17 mph).

Armament consisted of two single BL 4 in (102 mm) Mk VIII guns, one carried on the forecastle and another aft. Two single QF 12-pounder 3 in (76 mm) guns were mounted between the first two funnels. Two rotating 21-inch (533 mm) torpedo tubes were mounted aft of the funnels, with two reloads carried, and a searchlight fitted between the tubes. The destroyer was later modified to carry a single Vickers QF 3-pounder 2 in (47 mm) anti-aircraft gun and depth charges for anti-submarine warfare. The ship's complement was 72 officers and ratings.

== Construction and career ==
The 20 destroyers of the Acorn class were ordered by the Admiralty under the 1909–1910 Naval Programme. One of three in the class sourced from J. Samuel White, Redpole was laid down at the company's East Cowes shipyard on 10 December 1909 with yard number 1315 and launched on 24 June 1910. The ship was completed in February 1911, the fourth ship in Royal Navy service to be given the name, an alternative spelling of Redpoll.

On commissioning, Redpole joined the Second Destroyer Flotilla. Between 26 and 28 May 1912, the destroyer visited Aberystwyth, the first time the vessel was known to have travelled to Wales, subsequently returning to the naval base in Portsmouth. On 16 April 1914, the ship was transferred to Plymouth. After the British Empire declared war on Germany at the beginning of the First World War in August 1914, the Flotilla became part of the Grand Fleet. The destroyer was deployed to Devonport to undertake escort duties. On 28 August 1915, the flotilla took part in an anti-submarine patrol, accompanied by battleships and cruisers, but this was unsuccessful at destroying any submarines.

On 13 November 1915, the destroyer left Devonport to travel to the Mediterranean Sea in support of a proposed joint French and British operation in support of Serbia against Greece. In the end, there was no action as the Greek government acquiesced to the Allied demands on 23 November. The destroyer remained in the region and subsequently joined the Fifth Destroyer Flotilla of the Mediterranean Fleet before the year ended. The destroyer continued to operate there for the remainder of the war. On 20 January 1918, Redpole was based at the naval base in Malta. Although mainly employed as an escort, the destroyer accompanied the Australian torpedo boat Torrens on a mission to rescue the Italian destroyer Benedetto Cairoli that had been damaged while serving on 10 April. Shortly after the end of the war, on 28 December, the ship briefly towed the Soviet destroyer Shchastlivyi from Sevastapol to Ismid, although this was marred by a fire in the Soviet warship's oil tanks. The ship subsequently sank while on tow to Malta.

After the Armistice, the Royal Navy returned to a peacetime level of strength and both the number of ships and the amount of staff needed to be reduced to save money. Redpole returned to Devonport and was placed in reserve. This position did not last long, and Redpole was sold to be broken up at Milford Haven to Thos. W. Ward on 9 May 1921.

== Pennant numbers ==
Pennant number	Date
H77	September 1915
H96	January 1918
H71	January 1919
