= HMS Comet (1910) =

Destroyer of the Royal Navy

Coordinates: 36°29′N 15°45′E

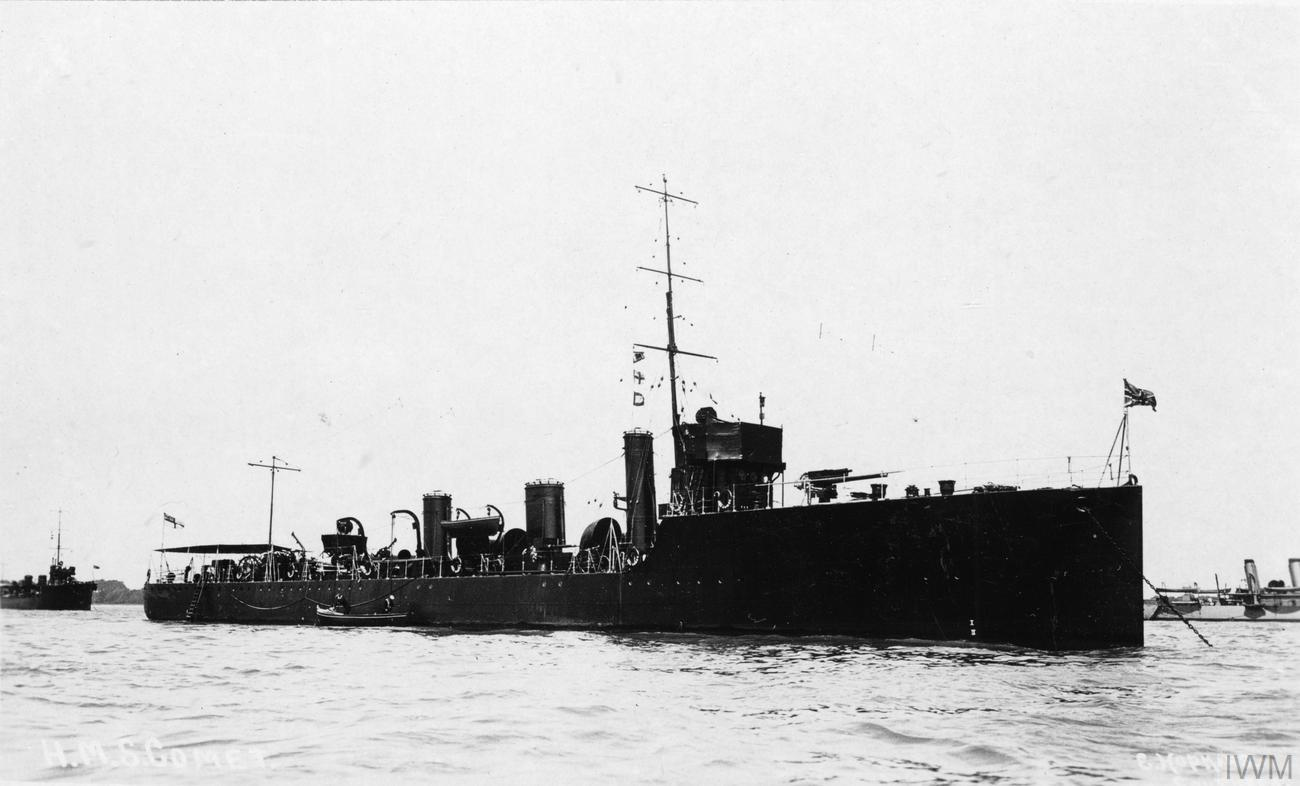
- Comet

History

United Kingdom
- Name: Comet
- Namesake: Great January Comet of 1910
- Builder: Fairfield Shipbuilding & Engineering Company, Govan
- Laid down: 1 February 1910
- Launched: 23 June 1910
- Completed: June 1911
- Fate: Sunk by torpedo, 6 August 1918

General characteristics
- Class & type: Acorn-class destroyer
- Displacement: 772 long tons (784 t)
- Length: 246 ft (75 m)
- Beam: 25 ft 5 in (7.7 m)
- Draught: 8 ft 6 in (2.6 m)
- Installed power: 4 Yarrow boilers; 13,500 shp (10,100 kW)
- Propulsion: 3 shafts; 1 steam turbine
- Speed: 27 knots (50 km/h; 31 mph)
- Range: 1,540 nmi (2,850 km; 1,770 mi) at 15 knots (28 km/h; 17 mph)
- Complement: 72
- Armament: 2 × 4 in (102 mm) guns; 2 × 12 pdr (3 in (76 mm) gun; 2 × 21 in (533 mm) torpedo tubes

HMS Comet was one of 20 Acorn-class destroyers built for the Royal Navy in the 1910s. Completed in 1911 she saw active service in the First World War.

== Design and description ==
The Acorn class marked a return to oil-firing as pioneered in the Tribal or F class of 1905 and HMS Swift of 1907. The Admiralty provided general specifications, but each shipyard did their own detailed design so that ships often varied in size. The Acorns had an overall length of 246 feet (75 m), a beam of 25 feet 5 inches (7.7 m), and a deep draught of 8 feet 6 inches (2.6 m). The ships displaced 772 long tons (784 t) at deep load and their crew numbered 72 officers and ratings.

The destroyers were powered by a single Parsons steam turbine that drove three propeller shafts using steam provided by four Yarrow boilers. The engines developed a total of 13,500 shaft horsepower (10,100 kW) and were designed for a speed of 27 knots (50 km/h; 31 mph). Comet reached a speed of 27.9 knots (51.7 km/h; 32.1 mph) from 13,726 shp (10,235 kW) during her sea trials. The Acorns had a range of 1,540 nautical miles (2,850 km; 1,770 mi) at a cruising speed of 15 knots (28 km/h; 17 mph).

The primary armament of the ships consisted of a pair of BL 4-inch (102 mm) MK VIII guns in single, unprotected pivot mounts fore and aft of the superstructure. They were also armed with two single QF 12-pounder (3-inch (76 mm)) guns, one on each broadside between the forward and centre funnels. The destroyer were equipped with a pair of single rotating mounts for 21-inch (533 mm) torpedo tubes amidships and carried two reload torpedoes.

== Construction and career ==
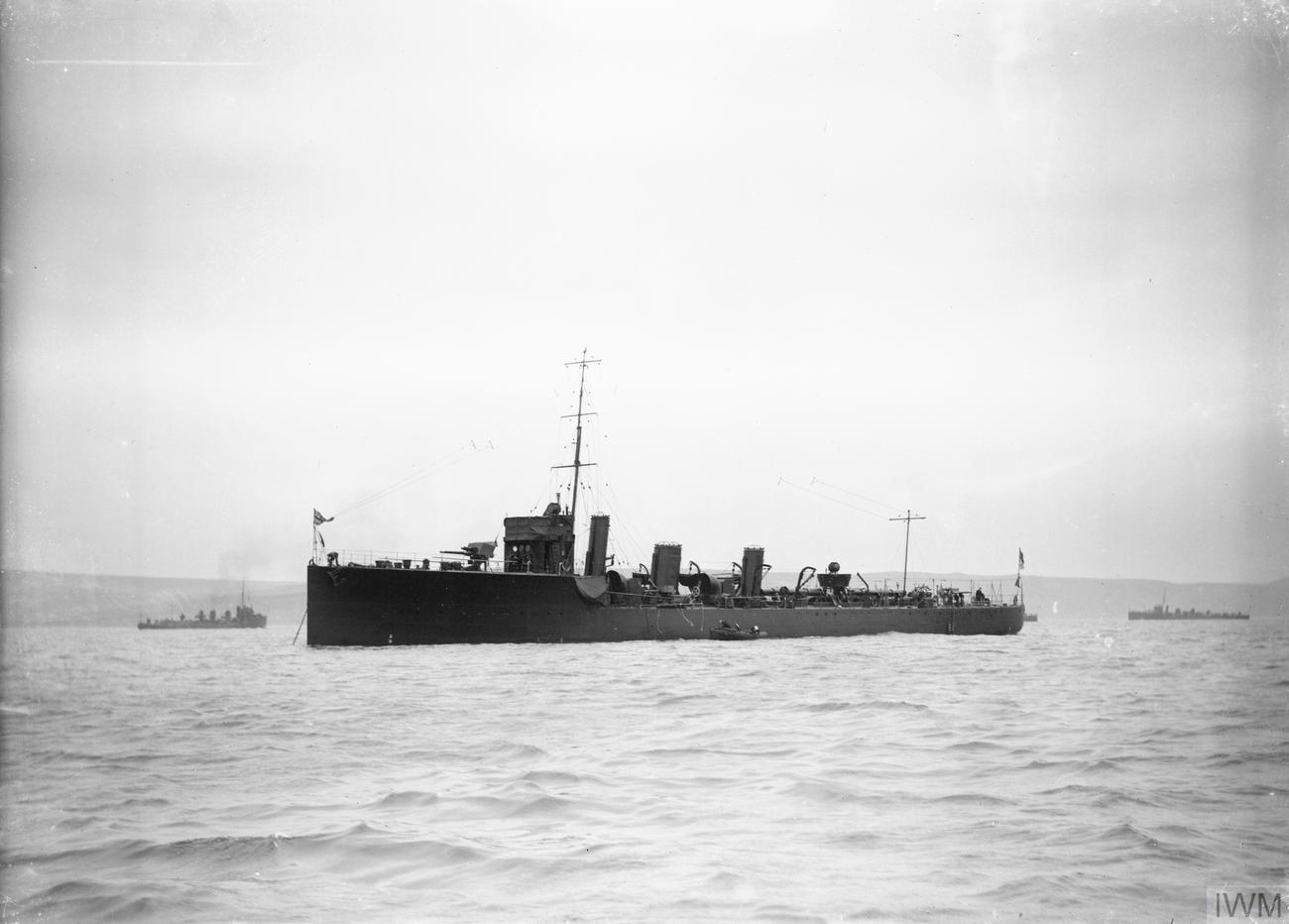
Comet, c. 1914–1918

Comet was ordered under the 1909–1910 Naval Programme from Fairfield Shipbuilding & Engineering Company. The ship was laid down at the company's Govan shipyard on 1 February 1910, launched on 23 June and commissioned in June 1911. She was torpedoed and sunk on 6 August 1918.

== Bibliography ==
- Friedman, Norman (2009). British Destroyers: From Earliest Days to the Second World War. Barnsley, UK: Seaforth Publishing. ISBN 978-1-84832-049-9.
- Gardiner, Robert & Gray, Randal, eds. (1985). Conway's All The World's Fighting Ships 1906–1921. London: Conway Maritime Press. ISBN 0-85177-245-5.
- March, Edgar J. (1966). British Destroyers: A History of Development, 1892–1953; Drawn by Admiralty Permission From Official Records & Returns, Ships' Covers & Building Plans. London: Seeley Service. OCLC 164893555.
- Jellicoe, John (1919). The Grand Fleet 1914–16: Its Creation, Development and Work. London: Cassell and Company. OCLC 859842281.
