= SS Cameronia (1911) =

British ocean liner

Coordinates: 35°50′N 17°32′E

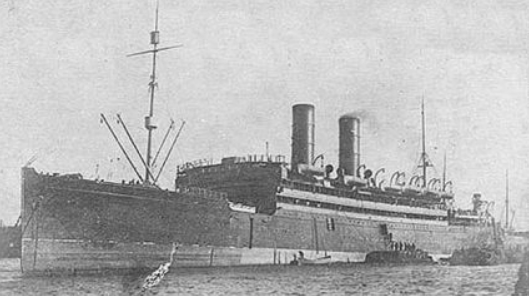
- SS Cameronia

History

United Kingdom
- Name: Cameronia
- Owner: Anchor Line
- Builder: D. and W. Henderson and Company, Glasgow
- Yard number: 472
- Laid down: 1911
- Launched: 27 May 1911
- Completed: September 1911
- Maiden voyage: 13 September 1911
- Fate: Sunk on 15 April 1917

General characteristics
- Type: Ocean liner
- Tonnage: 10,968 GRT
- Length: 515 ft (157 m) (pp)
- Beam: 62 ft 4 in (19.00 m)
- Propulsion: Twin propellers; triple-expansion steam engine; 15,600 IHP
- Speed: 16 knots (30 km/h) (service); 19 knots (35 km/h) (max)
- Capacity: 1,700 passenger (1911); 1,468 passengers (1915)

SS Cameronia was a twin propeller, triple-expansion, 15,600-indicated-horsepower (11,600 kW) passenger steamship owned by the Glasgow-based Anchor Line and built by D. and W. Henderson and Company at Glasgow in 1911. The ship provided a transatlantic service from Glasgow to various destinations.

The Cameronia sailed on her maiden voyage for the Anchor Line company on 13 September 1911 on the Glasgow – Moville – New York City route. In February 1915, the Cameronia was employed in a joint Anchor-Cunard company service on the Glasgow – Liverpool – New York route.

On 21 June 1915 while inbound in the mouth of the Mersey the Cameronia was attacked by a U-boat. Captain Kinnaird turned to ram the U-boat which was forced to dive and then broke off her attack.

The Cameronia was torpedoed on 15 April 1917 by the German U-boat U-33 while en route from Marseille, France, to Alexandria, Egypt. She was serving as a British troopship at the time and contained approximately 2,650 soldiers on board. The ship sank in 40 minutes, 150 miles east of Malta; taking 210 lives. Other sources report only 140 casualties. Most of the crew and embarked soldiers were picked up by the escorting destroyers HMS Nemesis and HMS Rifleman. The remainder of the survivors had sufficient time to take to lifeboats.

Scottish commodore and nautical writer David W. Bone wrote a firsthand account of the sinking of Cameronia.
