= HMS Brisk (1910) =

Destroyer of the Royal Navy

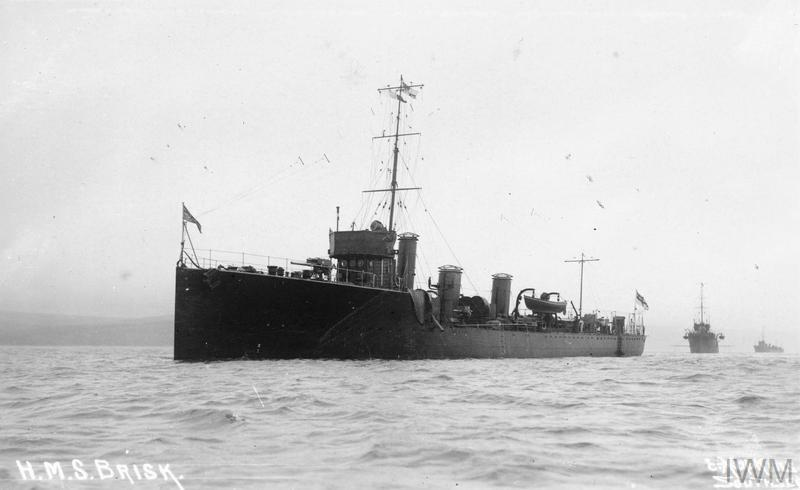
- Brisk

History

United Kingdom
- Name: Brisk
- Builder: Brown, Clydebank
- Laid down: 21 February 1910
- Launched: 20 September 1910
- Commissioned: June 1911
- Out of service: 15 November 1921
- Fate: Sold to be broken up

General characteristics (as built)
- Class & type: Acorn-class destroyer
- Displacement: 780 long tons (790 t) normal
- Length: 246 ft (75 m) o.a.
- Beam: 25 ft 5 in (7.7 m)
- Draught: 8 ft 6 in (2.6 m)
- Installed power: 4 Yarrow boilers 13,500 shp (10,100 kW)
- Propulsion: 2 Brown-Curtis steam turbines, 2 shafts
- Speed: 27 kn (50 km/h; 31 mph)
- Range: 1,540 nmi (2,850 km; 1,770 mi) at 15 kn (28 km/h; 17 mph)
- Complement: 72
- Armament: 2 × single BL 4 in (102 mm) guns; 2 × single QF 12 pdr 3 in (76 mm) gun; 2 × single 21 in (533 mm) torpedo tubes

HMS Brisk was one of 20 Acorn-class (later H-class) destroyers built for the Royal Navy that served in the First World War. The Acorn class were smaller than the preceding Beagle class but oil-fired and better armed. Launched in 1910, Brisk was the first destroyer equipped with two Brown-Curtis steam turbines and two shafts. At the start of the war, the ship served with the Second Destroyer Flotilla of the Grand Fleet. The destroyer spent most of the war in anti-submarine warfare and was upgraded for this purpose with increasing capacity for attack with depth charges. Despite being involved in many actions, the ship did not sink any enemy boats, although the ship did rescue many survivors of ships sunk, including the troop ship SS Mendi, as well as surviving a torpedo attack from the German submarine U-84 and hitting a mine, all in 1917. Having spent most of the war in the seas around the British Isles, Brisk ended the war as part of the Aegean Squadron of the Mediterranean Fleet. After the Armistice, Brisk was placed in reserve before being sold to be broken up in 1921.

== Design and description ==
After the preceding coal-burning Beagle class, the Acorn-class destroyers saw a return to oil-firing. Pioneered by the Tribal class of 1905 and HMS Swift of 1907, using oil enabled a more efficient design, leading to a smaller vessel which also had increased deck space available for weaponry. Unlike previous destroyer designs, where the individual yards had been given discretion within the parameters set by the Admiralty, the Acorn class were a set, with the propulsion machinery the only major variation between the different ships. This enabled costs to be reduced. The class was later renamed the H class.

Brisk was 240-foot (73 m) long between perpendiculars and 246 ft (75 m) overall, with a beam of 25 ft 5 in (7.7 m) and a deep draught of 8 ft 6 in (2.6 m). Displacement was 780 long tons (870 short tons; 790 tonnes) normal and 855 long tons (869 t) full load. Power was provided by two Brown-Curtis steam turbines, each driving a single shaft. The destroyer was the first to have this arrangement rather than the traditional triple Parsons turbines. This also meant that Brisk was the first Royal Navy destroyer with two shafts. The turbines were fed by four Yarrow boilers. Three funnels were fitted, the foremost tall and thin, the central short and thick and the aft narrow. The engines were rated at 13,500 shaft horsepower (10,100 kW) and design speed was 27 knots (50 km/h; 31 mph). On trial, Brisk achieved 27.6 knots (51.1 km/h; 31.8 mph). The vessel carried 170 long tons (170 t) of fuel oil which gave a range of 1,540 nautical miles (2,850 km; 1,770 mi) at a cruising speed of 15 kn (28 km/h; 17 mph).

Armament consisted of a single BL 4 in (102 mm) Mk VIII gun carried on the forecastle and another aft. Two single QF 12-pounder 3 in (76 mm) guns were mounted between the first two funnels. Two rotating 21-inch (533 mm) torpedo tubes were mounted aft of the funnels, with two reloads carried, and a searchlight fitted between the tubes. The destroyer was later modified to carry a single Vickers QF 3-pounder 2 in (47 mm) anti-aircraft gun and depth charges for anti-submarine warfare. At least one paravane was also fitted. The ship's complement was 72 officers and ratings.

== Construction and career ==
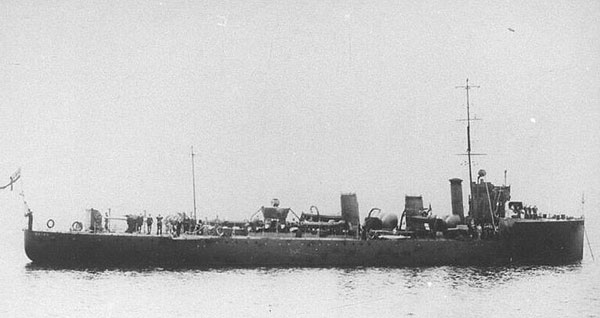
Brisk

The 20 destroyers of the Acorn class were ordered by the Admiralty under the 1909–1910 Naval Programme. The third of three in the class sourced from John Brown & Company, Brisk was laid down at the company's Clydebank shipyard on 21 February 1910, launched on 20 September 1910 and completed in June 1911. The ship was the sixth ship in Royal Navy service to have the name.

Brisk joined the Second Destroyer Flotilla. In August 1914, the Flotilla mobilised as part of the Grand Fleet and the destroyers were deployed to Devonport to undertake escort duties. During the First World War, the destroyer was frequently sent on "submarine sweeps", patrols specifically to look for German submarines. On 8 November 1915, the destroyer undertook a sweep of the English Channel with two other members of the Fourth Destroyer Flotilla. On the following day, Brisk joined three other destroyers to undertake another sweep from Portsmouth. Neither time did the destroyer see any submarines.

Soon afterwards, the Admiralty withdrew the destroyers from patrols and reallocated them to be escorts. For example, on 31 January 1917, Brisk accompanied SS Calgarian steaming to Halifax, Nova Scotia with gold, while 22 March was spent protecting the pre-dreadnought battleship Prince of Wales. Destruction could, however, come from other quarters. On 21 February, Brisk was escorting the troop ship SS Mendi off the coast of the Isle of Wight when the cargo ship SS Darro appeared out of the fog. Darro struck Mendi, which started to sink, and then steamed off, leaving Brisk to rescue the survivors. In all, 647 died in the tragedy. Having an escorting vessel was often sufficient to deter submarine attack. For example, on 18 April, the merchant ship SS Frankier was approached by the submarine U-84, which fired a torpedo that missed by 20 yards (18 m). Almost immediately, Brisk responded but the submarine disappeared before the destroyer had time to prepare an attack. Other ships were less lucky. On 29 May, although Brisk was dispatched to escort the vessel in, the steamer SS Oswego was caught by the submarine U-88 before the destroyer arrived and was dispatched by a torpedo. After rescuing survivors, the destroyer heard the call of another ship, SS Ashleaf. Arriving in time to see a periscope riding through the water, Brisk attacked with depth charges and drove the submarine away. Ashleaf arrived safely. On 2 October, Brisk suffered too. While providing an anti-submarine escort to the damaged armoured cruiser Drake, the destroyer struck a mine and had to be towed back to port by two trawlers.

During 1918, Brisk was transferred to the Aegean Squadron of the Mediterranean Fleet, joining the rest of the renamed H class. In June, the destroyer was rearmed. One paravane crane and two depth charge chutes were removed and two depth charge throwers and one depth charge track were fitted instead. Capacity was increased to 23 depth charges.

After the Armistice, the Royal Navy returned to a peacetime level of strength and both the number of ships and personnel needed to be reduced to save money. On 15 October 1919, Brisk was decommissioned and placed under Care and Maintenance in reserve at Devonport. The vessel was sold for breaking up to J. Distin of Devonport on 15 November 1921.

== Pennant numbers ==
Pennant number	Date
H18	December 1914
H70	September 1915
H22	January 1918
H65	January 1919
