= HMS Delphinium (1915) =

Arabis-class sloop launched in 1915

History

United Kingdom
- Name: Delphinium
- Builder: Napier and Miller, Yard 207, Old Kilpatrick, Glasgow
- Laid down: 1 July 1915
- Launched: 23 December 1915
- Recommissioned: 18 December 1928, Chatham
- Identification: Pennant number: T.54 (Jan, 1916), T.30 (Jan, 1918)
- Fate: Sold for scrapping, 13 October 1933

General characteristics
- Class & type: Arabis-class sloop
- Displacement: 1,200 tons
- Length: 268 ft 0 in (81.69 m) o/a
- Beam: 33 ft 6 in (10.21 m)
- Draught: 11 ft 0 in (3.35 m)
- Propulsion: 1 × 4-cylinder triple expansion steam engine; 2000ihp; 2 boilers, coal; Single shaft, 1 screw
- Speed: 16 knots (30 km/h; 18 mph)
- Complement: 90 (RN)
- Armament: 2 × 1 - QF 4.7 inch Mk IV guns and 2 × 1 - 3-pounders (47 mm) AA.
- Armour: Triple hull in bows

HMS Delphinium was an Arabis-class sloop launched in 1915. During World War I, Delphinium was operated by the Royal Navy as a minesweeper and escort, based in Queenstown. She escorted merchant vessels and was involved in rescuing the crews of two merchant ships sunk by German submarines. Delphinium paid out in 1919, but was re-commissioned in Chatham on 18 December 1928 for duty in the Africa Station until 1932. During this time Delphinium made duty calls to a number of African countries and in 1929, hosted the Christy Commission of the League of Nations, during its work in Liberia. Delphinium was sold for scrap on 13 October 1933.

== Design and construction ==
Delphinium was one of 36 Arabis-class sloops ordered and laid down in 1915 for the Royal Navy during World War I. The class were intended for minesweeping duties in European waters, but Delphinium also performed duties as a merchant vessel escort.

Delphinium had a displacement of 1,200 tons. She was 267 feet 9 inches (81.61 m) in length overall, had a beam of 33 feet 6 inches (10.21 m), and a maximum draught of 11 feet 9 inches (3.58 m). The propulsion system consisted of a four-cylinder triple expansion engine, connected to a single propeller shaft. Maximum speed was 16.0 knots (29.6 km/h; 18.4 mph).

Delphinium was laid down for the Royal Navy by Napier and Miller, Glasgow, Scotland, 1 July 1915 and launched on 23 December 1915.

== Service history ==
=== 1915 to 1919 ===
During World War I, Delphinium was stationed in Queenstown as a minesweeper and merchant vessel escort. Initially Delphinium was part of the 3rd Sloop Flotilla, but in December 1918, Delphinium was assigned to the 23rd Fleet Sweeping Flotilla operating from Buncrana. On 1 April 1917, Delphinium escorted the RFA Boxleaf, an Emergency Wartime Construction (LEAF) oiler tanker in the Irish Sea. On 28 April 1917, German submarine SM U-70 stopped the merchant ship Anne Marie. The crew were ordered to leave the ship before it was sunk, were taken aboard Delphinium 18 hours later and brought to Queenstown. On 31 August 1917, Delphinium entered Lough Swilly harbour, Buncrana, towing US tanker SS Albert Watts.

On 2 October 1917, German submarine SM U-79 torpedoed the armoured cruiser HMS Drake, causing it to lose the use of its steam steering gear. Drake subsequently collided with cargo ship Mendip Range, eventually sinking in Church Bay near Rathlin Island. Delphinium and the destroyer Martin came alongside to remove the crew.

Delphinium paid out in Queenstown, 23 July 1919.

=== 1920 to 1925 ===
Delphinium held in depot in Devonport.

=== 1925 to 1932 ===
After 1926, Delphinium was re-commissioned several times and each time assigned to duty in the Africa Station. During her service, Delphinium worked primarily along the west coast of Africa, with documented stops in Monrovia (Liberia), South Knysna and Simonstown (Africa), Limbé (Cameroon, then called Victoria in the British Cameroons), the Canary Islands, Opobo and Lagos (Nigeria).

In 1929, Delphinium hosted aboard a League of Nations Commission of Enquiry (the Christy Commission). The Commission of Enquiry was investigating allegations of modern slavery on the island of Fernando Po linked to Liberia. Delphinium anchored in the open roadstead in Monrovia, Liberia, there being no port at that time.

In 1932, Delphinium visited Knysna, South Africa and a crew detail was sent ashore to polish the brass and clip the grass on the grave of “Bondi”, the ship's dog mascot of HMS Verbena (1915).

In 1932, Delphinium was recalled and sailed from Simonstown, South Africa to England, arriving at Portsmouth in March 1933. She was replaced on the Africa station by the new sloop Weston.

== Decommissioning and fate ==
Delphinium paid off 7 March 1933 and was sold for scrap to Rees Metals Ltd., Llanelli, 13 October 1933.
