= HMS Swift (1907) =

Destroyer of the Royal Navy

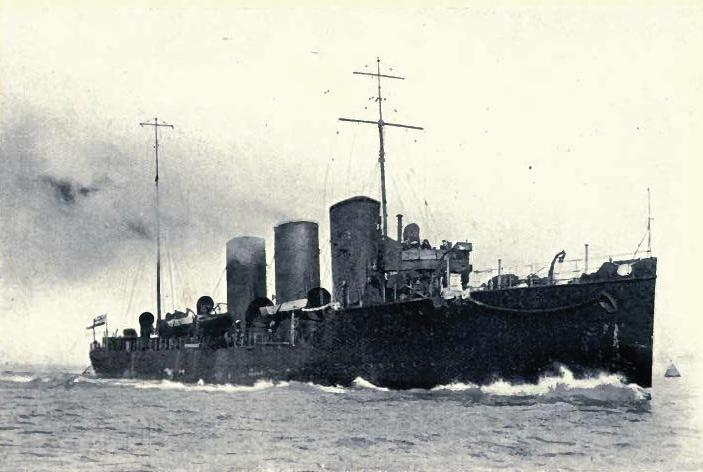
- Swift at sea

History

United Kingdom
- Name: Swift
- Builder: Cammell Laird, Birkenhead
- Laid down: 1905
- Launched: 7 December 1907
- Commissioned: August 1910
- Fate: Sold to break up 9 December 1921

General characteristics
- Type: Destroyer leader
- Displacement: 1,825 long tons (1,854 t)
- Length: 353.75 ft (107.8 m)
- Beam: 34.5 ft (10.5 m)
- Draught: 10.5 ft (3.2 m)
- Installed power: 12 Yarrow-type Laird water tube boilers; 30,000 shp (22,000 kW)
- Propulsion: 4 shafts; steam turbines
- Speed: 34 knots (63 km/h; 39 mph)
- Complement: 138
- Armament: As built; 4 × 4 in (102 mm) guns; 1 × 2 pdr (40 mm (1.6 in)) AA gun; 2 × single 18 in (450 mm) torpedo tubes; Following 1917 refit: 1 × single 6 in (152 mm) gun; 2 × single 4 in guns; 1 × single 2 pdr AA gun; 2 × single 21 in torpedo tubes

HMS Swift was a unique destroyer leader designed and built for the Royal Navy prior to World War I, another product of Admiral "Jackie" Fisher's relentless quest for speed. The class was envisioned as a large ocean-going destroyer, capable of both the usual destroyer requirements and of high-speed scouting duties for a major fleet.

== Design ==
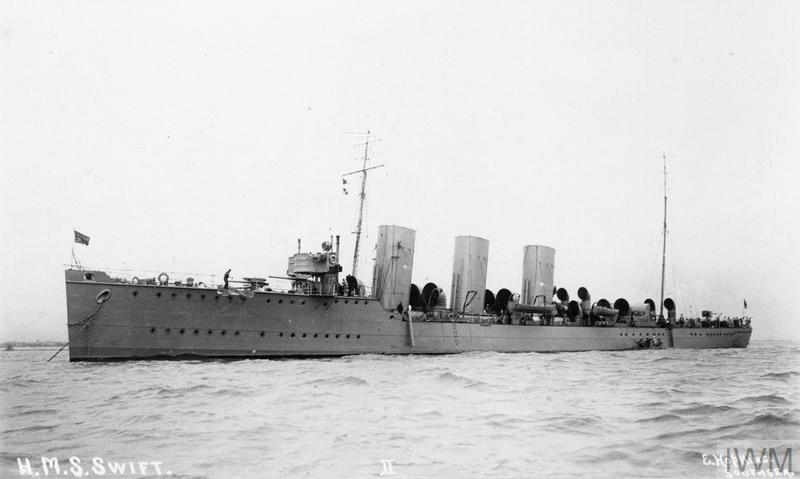
Swift, pennant number D 60

Fisher put his specification to the Director of Naval Construction (DNC) in October 1904 (320 feet (98 m), 900 tons, 36 knots (67 km/h; 41 mph)). The DNC replied that it was not strong enough. In 1905 a revised design for 33.5 knots (62.0 km/h; 38.6 mph) from 19,000 shp (14,000 kW) on a 1,400 t hull was pushed through followed by one for 36 knots on 1,350 tons from 29,000 shp (22,000 kW).

Given only four weeks to produce their tender, the major shipyards - Cammell Laird, Thornycrofts, Fairfields, John Brown and Armstrong Whitworth - put forward designs. There were problems meeting the requirements and the high cost of the designs (for example, Armstrong's design was priced at £284,000, compared to £139,881 for HMS Afridi, a destroyer of the 1905 Tribal class). A final design was not agreed until mid-December 1905; Cammell Laird only taking the order on their proviso that amendments would be needed. The vessel was 340 feet (100 m), 1,680 tons, armed with four Mark VIII 4-inch guns and two 18-inch (457 mm) torpedo tubes, and 30,000 shp (22,000 kW) oil-fired Parsons steam turbines with four shafts. The vessel was priced at £236,000 and given the building name Flying Scud (changed to Swift in April 1906). Work started in December 1906 and she was launched on 7 December 1907.

In the initial contract the Admiralty included an offer of £18,000 for every knot more than 36 knots. In trials over a measured mile at Skelmorlie in March 1909 she suffered a number of mechanical failures and never managed better than 35.099 knots, at a shocking fuel consumption of 27.5 tons/hour out of a total stock of only 180 tons. Later trials, up to September 1909, used 26 different propeller designs in an attempt to reach the required speed. The Admiralty finally accepted her as she was for £236,764 with £44,240 in penalties for the failure to reach contracted speed and late delivery. After arguments from the builder as to the difficulty of the task the penalties were reduced to £5,000. Reports to the press at the time claimed Swift could reach 38 knots.

Despite being the prototype for her class, no other leaders were built before the outbreak of war in 1914. Her weak armament, and high cost caused Arthur Wilson to note "I do not think we require any repetition of Swift in the immediate future." Naval historian Antony Preston has for this reason given a sharp criticism of the ship, describing it as a 'very expensive and disappointing outcome'.

== Service history ==
At the beginning of the war as leader of the 4th Torpedo Boat Destroyer Flotilla she joined the Grand Fleet. In October, Swift was dispatched from Scapa Flow to search for the protected cruiser HMS Hawke when she did not return from patrol. Instead, Swift found one of Hawke's rafts carrying one officer, and 21 men. Hawke had been torpedoed and sunk by a German U-boat, with only a handful of survivors. The extreme weather of the northern winter seas was more than Swift could withstand and in 1915, after a short refit, she was reassigned to the Dover Patrol. In 1916 her two forward 4-inch guns were replaced by a single BL 6-inch Mk VII gun on a P Mk III mount (the Tribal-class HMS Viking was similarly rearmed, making them the only two destroyers of the Royal Navy ever to carry such weapons). The intention was to counter the superior range of the 10.5 cm (4.1-in) SK L/45 carried by German torpedo boats. Her forward decks were reinforced to cope with the mass and recoil of the new gun and she also received additional bridge structures and two anti-aircraft guns.

On the night of 20–21 April 1917, while commanded by Ambrose Peck and accompanying the destroyer HMS Broke, she engaged a force of six enemy destroyers in the Battle of Dover Strait. In a confused fight she hit G85 with a torpedo while Broke rammed, and became enmeshed with, G42. The remaining German ships fled, Swift pursued but took several hits and was compelled to slow. She returned to assist Broke and rescue survivors of G 42 before returning to Plymouth. The 6-inch gun was found to have poor performance, though plans to upgrade it to a powered P Mk VI mount or replace it with two high velocity QF 4-inch Mk Vs did not materialize and she retained that armament for the rest of her service.

In the spring of 1918 she was with the Offshore Squadron during the First Ostend Raid. Quietly sidelined and scrapped after the war, her size was not approached in the Royal Navy until the Tribal class of 1936.

== Sources ==
- British Destroyers: From Earliest Days to the Second World War, Norman Friedman, 2009, ISBN 978-1-84832-049-9
- Destroyers of the Royal Navy, 1893-1981, Maurice Cocker, 1983, Ian Allan, ISBN 0-7110-1075-7
- Destroyers, Antony Preston, 1977, Bison Books, ISBN 0-86124-057-X
- Jane's Fighting Ships, 1919, Jane's Publishing
- Conway's All The World's Fighting Ships 1906-1921 1985, Conway Maritime Press p73
- The World's Worst Warships, Antony Preston, 2002, Conway Maritime Press, ISBN 0-85177-754-6
