= 2nd Destroyer Flotilla =

- Active: January 1909–1943, 1945-1946
- Country: United Kingdom
- Branch: Royal Navy
- Size: Flotilla

Commanders
- First: Captain Edwyn Alexander-Sinclair
- Last: Captain Bernard Armitage Warburton Warburton-Lee

The British 2nd Destroyer Flotilla (also styled as Second Destroyer Flotilla) was a naval formation of the Royal Navy from 1909 to 1943 and again from 1945 to 1946.

== History ==
The 2nd Destroyer Flotilla originated in early 1907 as a part of a Home Fleet Flotilla within the Home Fleet. In February 1909, that Home Fleet Flotilla was split into the 2nd and 4th Destroyer Flotillas. The new flotilla was then assigned to the 2nd Division of the Home Fleet from February 1909 to May 1912. From May 1912 to July 1914 the flotilla was part of the Home Fleet's First Fleet. It was then transferred to the Grand Fleet from August 1914 to April 1916. After its stay with the Grand Fleet the flotilla was assigned to the Plymouth Command from April 1916 to November 1917 and was stationed at Devonport. It was next assigned to the Coast of Ireland Station from November 1917 to November 1918 based at Derry. After World War One the flotilla was assigned to the Atlantic Fleet from December 1918 to November 1924. In December 1924 it was sent to join the Mediterranean Fleet where it stayed until June 1932. It was recalled to home waters as part of the Home Fleet between from June 1932 to August 1936. It was sent back to join the Mediterranean Fleet from August 1936 until September 1939. The flotilla was gradually dispersed to the South Atlantic and West Indies, and in January 1940 it was reformed once more as part of the Home Fleet until May 1940. On 1 June 1940 it was sent to join the Mediterranean Fleet until 1 August 1942. It was next transferred to the Eastern Fleet where it remained until June 1943 when it was disbanded. The flotilla was re-established in July 1944 and assigned to the Home Fleet until 1947. Its final posting was with the Mediterranean Fleet until 1951 when it was re-designated as the 2nd Destroyer Squadron.

=== Operational deployments ===
Assigned to	Dates	Notes
Home Fleet	March 1907 to February 1909	as a Home Fleet Destroyer Flotilla
Home Fleet, 2nd Division	February 1909 to May 1912	
Home Fleets, First Fleet	May 1912 to July 1914	
Grand Fleet	August 1914 to April 1916	
Plymouth Command	April 1916 to November 1917	stationed at Devonport
Coast of Ireland Station	November 1917 to November 1918	stationed at Derry
Atlantic Fleet	December 1918 to November 1924	
Mediterranean Fleet	November 1924 to June 1932	
Home Fleet	June 1932 to August 1936	
Mediterranean Fleet	August 1936 to December 1939	flotilla is split up with ships sent to West Indies and South Atlantic Station
Home Fleet	January 1940 to May 1940	reformed
Mediterranean Fleet	1 June 1940 to 1 August 1942	
Eastern Fleet	August 1942 to June 1943	
Home Fleet	July 1944 to 1947	
Mediterranean Fleet	1948 to 1951	renamed 2nd Destroyer Squadron

== Administration ==
A Captain (D) afloat or Captain Destroyers afloat is an operational commander responsible for the command of a destroyer flotilla or squadron.

=== Captains (D) afloat 2nd Destroyer Flotilla ===
Incomplete list of post holders included:

	Rank	Name	Term	Notes
Captain (D) afloat 2nd Destroyer Flotilla
1	Captain	Edwyn S. Alexander-Sinclair	5 January 1909 – 7 February 1911	(later Adm.)
2	Captain	The Hon. Hubert G. Brand	7 February 1911 - 10 August 1912	(later Adm.)
3	Captain	Reginald Y. Tyrwhitt	10 August 1912 – 1 December 1913	(later Adm.of the Fleet)
4	Captain	James U. Farie	1 December 1913 – 11 March 1914	
4	Captain	John B. Sparks	12 October 1915 – 1 March 1919	
4	Captain	Colin K. MacLean	1 March 1919 – 29 April 1920	(later V. Adm)
5	Captain	Humphrey T. Walwyn	29 April 1920 – 9 May 1922	
6	Captain	Roger L'E. M. Rede	9 May 1922 – 1 November 1923	
7	Captain	Eric G. Robinson	1 November 1923 – 30 May 1925	
8	Captain	George H. D'O. Lyon	30 May 1925 – 7 May 1927	(later Adm.)
9	Captain	Montague G. B. Legge	2 May 1927 – 19 December 1928	
10	Captain	William J. Whitworth	19 December 1928 – February, 1931	(later Adm.)
11	Captain	Alfred H. Taylor	5 July 1931 – 12 May 1932	
12	Captain	Edye K. Boddam-Whetham	26 May 1932 – August, 1934	
13	Captain	Cedric S. Holland	August, 1934 – 12 January 1937	
14	Captain	Denis W. Boyd	7 October 1936 – 25 February 1938	
15	Captain	Ralph Kerr	25 February 1938 - 28 July 1939	
16	Captain	Bernard A. W. Warburton-Lee	28 July 1939 – 10 April 1940	

== Sources ==
- Harley, Simon; Lovell, Tony. (2018) "Second Destroyer Flotilla (Royal Navy) - The Dreadnought Project". www.dreadnoughtproject.org. Harley and Lovell.
- Watson, Dr Graham. (2015) Royal Navy Organisation and Ship Deployments 1900-1914". www.naval-history.net. G. Smith.
- Watson, Dr Graham. (2015) "Royal Navy Organisation and Ship Deployment, Inter-War Years 1914-1918". www.naval-history.net. Gordon Smith.
- Watson, Dr Graham. (2015) "Royal Navy Organisation in World War 2, 1939-1945". www.naval-history.net. Gordon Smith.
