= BL 4-inch Mk VIII naval gun =

Ordnance BL-4-inch Mk VIII naval gun
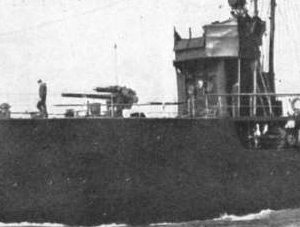
- Forward gun of HMS Defender
- Type: Naval gun

Service history
- In service: 1908–1945
- Used by: United Kingdom; Australia
- Wars: World War I – World War II

Production history
- Designed: 1904
- No. built: Mk VIII: 246; Mk XI: 30
- Variants: Mk VIII – Mk XI

Specifications
- Mass: 2,912 pounds (1,320 kg) (barrel & breech)
- Barrel length: 159.2 inches (4.044 m) bore (40 calibres)
- Shell: 31 pounds (14.06 kg) Common pointed, Common lyddite
- Calibre: 4 inches (101.6 mm)
- Breech: Welin, single-motion screw
- Elevation: -10° to +20°
- Rate of fire: 6-8 RPM
- Muzzle velocity: 2,287 feet per second (697 m/s)
- Maximum firing range: 10,210 yards (9,340 m)

The BL 4-inch Mark VIII naval gun (Note: Mark VIII = Mark 8. Mark XI = Mark 11. Britain used Roman numerals to denote marks (models) of ordnance until after World War II. This was the eighth model of British BL 4-inch gun.) was a British medium-velocity wire-wound naval gun introduced in 1908 as an anti-torpedo boat gun in smaller ships whose decks could not support the strain of the heavier and more powerful Mk VII gun.

== Mk VIII history ==
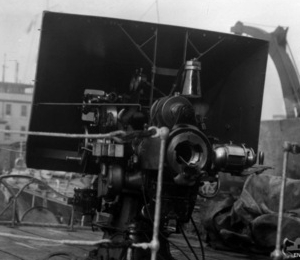
Breech of gun on HMAS Huon in March 1919

The gun succeeded the QF 4-inch Mk III, whose 25-pound (11 kg) shell had been considered insufficiently powerful for its intended role. The BL Mk VIII fired a 31-pound (14 kg) shell. It armed the following warships :

- HMS Swift laid down 1905
- Tribal-class destroyers from HMS Saracen (1908) onwards.
- Beagle-class destroyer of 1909
- Acorn-class destroyers of 1910
- Acheron-class destroyers of 1910
- River-class torpedo-boat destroyers (Australia) of 1910.

The gun was succeeded in its class from 1911 by the QF 4-inch Mk IV.

In World War II many guns were used to arm merchant ships.

== Mk XI submarine gun ==
A Mark XI-variant was adapted to arm the K-class submarines laid down 1915.

== See also ==
- List of naval guns
- German 10.5 cm SK L/40 naval gun – firing slightly heavier shell

== Sources ==
- Friedman, Norman (2011). Naval Weapons of World War One: Guns, Torpedoes, Mines and ASW Weapons of All Nations; An Illustrated Directory. Seaforth Publishing. ISBN 978-1-84832-100-7.
- Handbook for the 4" Mark VII. and VIII. B.L. Guns 1913 (Corrected to September 1913.) Admiralty Gunnery Branch, G.8652/13
