= Imperial Japanese Navy in World War I =

The Imperial Japanese Navy conducted the majority of Japan's military operations during World War I. Japan entered the war on the side of the Entente, against Germany and Austria-Hungary as a consequence of the 1902 Anglo-Japanese Alliance. Japanese participation in the war was limited. Campaigns or operations included the capture of Tsingtao, the hunt for the German East Asia Squadron, the capture of German colonies in the Pacific, and operations in the Mediterranean. These were noteworthy events, but considered marginal to the outcome of the war.

== Naval operations off Tsingtao ==
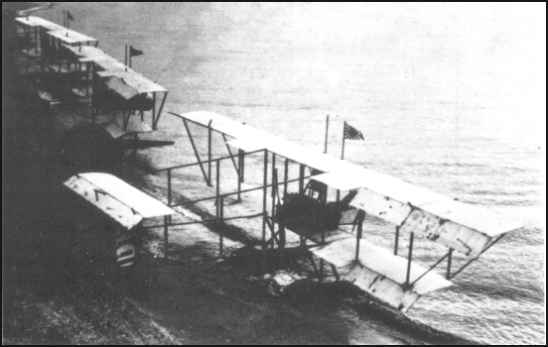
Maurice Farman seaplanes used during the siege of Tsingtao.

On 27 August 1914, the 2nd Fleet under Vice-Admiral Sadakichi Kato, was sent to blockade the German colony of Tsingtao on the Shandong peninsula. The 2nd fleet consisted mainly of older warships with the pre-dreadnought battleship Suwo being the flagship. Later on October 31, the Japanese together with a token British force then laid siege to the German colony. With the East Asia Squadron absent, the Imperial Japanese Navy mainly played a supporting role primarily by bombarding German and Austrian positions. However, the campaign was notable for the use of Japanese seaplanes from the Wakamiya. Starting from early September, four Maurice Farman seaplanes on board the Wakamiya conducted reconnaissance and aerial bombing operations over Tsingtao. The aircraft had crude bombsights and carried six to ten bombs that had been converted from artillery shells and were released through metal tubes on each side of the cockpit. On September 5, in the first successful operation, two Farman seaplanes dropped several bombs on the Bismarck battery which were the main German fortifications in Tsingtao. The bombs landed harmlessly in the mud but the aircraft were able to confirm that the SMS Emden was not present at Tsingtao, this intelligence was of major importance to Allied naval command. After the Wakamiya was damaged by a mine on September 30, the seaplanes continued to be used against the German defenders by transferring their operations near the shore. By the end of the siege and the surrender on 7 November 1914, the aircraft had conducted 50 sorties and dropped almost 200 bombs although damage to German defenses was light.

The Japanese did suffer some naval loses; on September 3, the destroyer Shirotae ran aground during fog in Jiaozhou Bay and was consequently destroyed by fire from German shore batteries and the gunboat SMS Jaguar. The auxiliary minesweepers Nagato Maru No.3 and Nagato Maru No.6 were lost to mines on October 3. The minelayer Takachiho sank after being torpedoed by the S90 on October 17, while Torpedo Boat 33 sank after hitting a mine on November 11, after the German surrender.

== Operations in the Pacific ==
=== Search for the East Asia Squadron ===
On 14 September, the South Seas Squadron under the command of Vice-Admiral Yamaya Tanin left Yokosuka in order to pursue the fleeing German East Asia Squadron. The squadron consisted of a battlecruiser (Kurama flagship), two cruisers, two destroyers and three transports. However, by this time, Vice-Admiral von Spee had left the Marshall Islands and was heading for Tahiti to attack the French port facilities there as he made for Cape Horn.

=== Hunt for the Emden and German commerce raiders ===
In late August 1914, with war declared the Japanese had wasted no time in deploying their powerful naval assets in support of allied efforts against German commerce raiders in the Asia-Pacific. The battlecruiser Kongō was immediately dispatched to patrol the sealanes and three days later on August 26, at the request of the British government, the Ibuki together with the light cruiser Chikuma were ordered to Singapore in order to provide support in the search for German commerce raiders, particularly the light cruiser Emden. Whilst the Chikuma stayed in the area patrolling unsuccessfully as far south as Ceylon, on September 18, the Ibuki was soon dispatched back eastwards to begin the task of escorting allied troop convoys carrying ANZAC contingents from Australia and New Zealand to the Middle East, from German raiders. The hunt for German commerce raiders continued and the Satsuma together with the light cruisers Yahagi and Hirado, were sent to watch the sea lanes around Australia. During October, in an effort to hunt down German ships the Japanese force in the Indian Ocean was greatly strengthened with all vessels coming under the command of Vice-Admiral Sōjirō Tochiuchi; ultimately employing two battlecruisers, Ibuki and Ikoma; three armoured cruisers, Tokiwa, Yakumo and Nisshin, and three light cruisers, Hirado, Yahagi and Chikuma. On November 1, in response to a British request, the Japanese assumed temporary responsibility for all Allied naval activity in the Indian Ocean east of 90 degrees longitude and remained in command for the rest of the month.

=== Seizure of German Pacific territories ===
After passing the Bonin Islands the South Seas squadron stopped at the Marianas but finding no sign of enemy ships pushed on rapidly as possible towards the Marshalls arriving at Eniwetok Atoll on September 29. The squadron's ultimate objective, however, was Jaluit Atoll which was the German commercial headquarters in the central Pacific. Anchoring off Jaluit on September 30, the Japanese found the vast lagoon empty and put a landing party ashore. The handful of German authorities on the island made no attempt to resist or to stir up the native population. After gaining control of the atoll, Vice-Amiral Yamaya radioed his report to naval headquarters in Tokyo. Instructions came back almost immediately, Yamaya was ordered to withdraw the landing party and that the South Seas squadron was to retire to Eniwetok. Yamaya complied and left westward only to receive further orders a few days later, stating that he was to return and land a permanent occupying force on Jaluit. On October 3, a permanent landing party of three officers and one hundred enlisted men was put ashore.

Concurrently, a second naval squadron had been formed at the request of the British government, which had requested to have a battlegroup sent to Australia in order to protect troop transports carrying ANZAC contingents on their journey to the Middle East. The Second South Seas Squadron, under the command of Rear-Admiral Matsumura Tatsuo, consisting of the battleship Satsuma and two light cruisers; departed from Sasebo on September 30. Rear-Admiral Yamaya's force was consequently renamed the First South Seas Squadron. Both squadrons were instructed to carry out temporary occupations of the principal German territories in Micronesia. On October 5, the First South Seas Squadron anchored off Kusaie; on the seventh it arrived at the island of Sokehs and entered Ponape Harbor; and on the twelfth the Kurama, followed by a cruiser escort, entered Truk Lagoon where the Japanese businessman and adventurer Mori Koben witnessed the vessels at anchor. In the west, Matsumura in Satsuma, escorted by two cruisers, sailed into the harbor at Yap much to the consternation to the Royal Australian Navy which had been on its way north to do so; on 7 October, a landing party was put ashore at Koror in the Palaus; on the ninth Angaur and its German phosphate mines were in Japanese hands; and on the fourteenth, the battleship Katori dropped anchor in the roadstead off Garapan Town on Saipan. The Japanese occupation of Micronesia with the except of the American colony of Guam and the British Gilberts was complete. Within two months the Imperial Japanese Navy had occupied all German possessions in the Pacific, north of the equator.

== Operations in the Mediterranean (1917–1918) ==
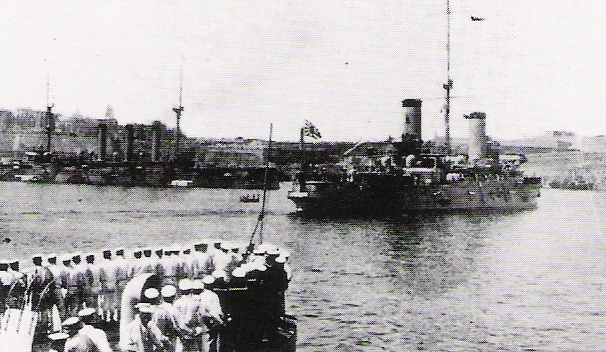
The Nisshin in Malta.

In 1917, Germany had issued a declaration of unrestricted submarine warfare against Allied shipping. In the Mediterranean, there were some thirty-four German and Austrian submarines operating from the Adriatic which were causing havoc with Allied shipping. Soon after, Japan accepted a British request for a destroyer division to be sent to the Mediterranean. In March of that year, the Japanese organized a special service squadron under Rear-Admiral Sato Kozo. The squadron consisted of a cruiser and two destroyer divisions, each composed of four of the navy's newest destroyers. (Note: The initial squadron was made up of the cruiser Akashi and the destroyers Ume, Kusunoki, Kaede, Katsura, Kashiwa, Matsu, Sugi, and Sakaki. In June, Akashi was replaced by Izumo, and four more destroyers were added the Kashi, Hinoki, Momo, and Yanagi. They were also later joined by the cruiser Nisshin.) Arriving in Malta during April at the height of the U-boat attacks, the small Japanese squadron immediately started escorting Allied troopships between Marseille, Taranto, and ports in Egypt. For the next year and a half, the squadron took part in some 348 escort missions, involving some 750 ships and covering over 240,000 nautical miles. The squadron quickly earned such a reputation for excellent seamanship, that the Royal Navy eventually turned over two of its destroyers to be manned by Japanese crews for the duration of the war. The destroyer Sakaki was, on June 11, torpedoed and lost fifty-nine officers and men including the captain but made it back to Malta and eventually rejoined the squadron.

Although the squadron was unable to claim a U-boat sinking, allied losses in the Mediterranean sharply dropped after the Japanese arrived on station. More importantly, the Japanese crews participating in escort operations learned much in the way of anti-submarine tactics, technology, and weaponry. However, these important principles of the convoy system and the lessons of anti-submarine warfare, learned by a handful of Japanese officers and men on a distant station were quickly forgotten. The operations in the Mediterranean were considered unremarkable by the naval staff in Tokyo, this oversight undoubtedly played some part in the disastrous failure of the Japanese to develop an effective counter to the operations of American submarines in the Pacific War.

A memorial at the Kalkara Naval Cemetery in Malta was dedicated to the 72 Japanese sailors who died in action during the Mediterranean convoy patrols.

== See also ==
- 1st Special Squadron (Japanese Navy) – Fleet assigned to patrol Australia
- North American Task Force – Fleet assigned to patrol Canada and later the West Pacific
