= 2nd Special Squadron (Japanese Navy) =

Japanese naval unit in WWI

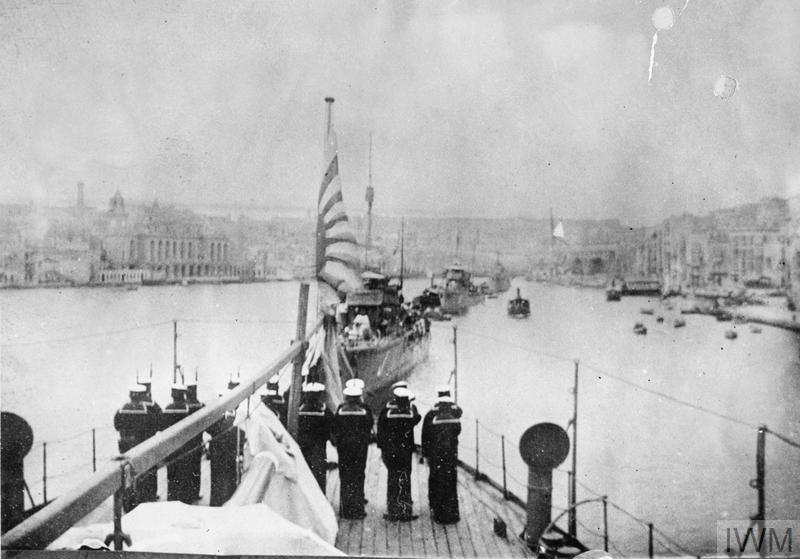
- IJN Destroyers at Marseille, France 1917
- Active: 10 February 1917 – 2 July 1919
- Country: Japan
- Branch: Imperial Japanese Navy
- Type: Fleet
- Role: Protection shipping in the Mediterranean theater of operations.
- Part of: Admiral, Japanese Command

The 2nd Special Squadron (10 February 1917 – 2 July 1919) was a unit of the Imperial Japanese Navy. In accordance with the Anglo-Japanese Alliance, the fleet helped defend Allied shipping in the Mediterranean theater of operations of World War I.

== Background ==
Troubled by the expansion of Russian influence in India, Korea and Manchuria, the British Empire and the Empire of Japan signed the Anglo-Japanese Alliance in 1902. The treaty was renewed in 1905 following Russia's defeat in the Russo-Japanese War, the focus of the alliance shifted towards Germany. In October 1911, Winston Churchill was appointed to the position of First Lord of the Admiralty, he sought to counter the potential threat posed by Germany in the North Sea by redeploying warships from the China Seas and the Mediterranean. The two countries renewed the treaty once again as Britain intended to relegate the responsibility of safeguarding its shipping in the Pacific and the Mediterranean to Japan and France respectively, in the event of a war. In 1914, the Imperial Japanese Navy was divided into three fleets. The 1st Fleet was commanded by Vice Admiral Katō Tomosaburō and consisted of the navy's most modern battleships and battlecruisers. The 2nd Fleet was largely formed of captured Russian ships and some cruisers, it was commanded by Katō Sadakichi. The 3rd Fleet was stationed in the South China Sea, it was composed of cruisers and cannon boats. Its total strength amounted to 50 destroyers, 14 battleships and battlecruisers, 13 armored cruisers, 10 lighter cruisers and old cruisers.

On 7 August 1914, Britain requested that Japan destroy the German East Asia Squadron. On 15 August, Japan issued Germany an ultimatum demanding the handover of the Kiautschou Bay concession and that German ships abandon Chinese waters, thus intervening into World War I on the side of the Triple Entente. With the expiration of the ultimatum Japan officially declared war on Germany, blockading, besieging and eventually capturing Tsingtao. In September, the 1st and 2nd South Sea Squadrons proceeded to German New Guinea, where they occupied the German administrative centers in Rabaul, the Caroline Islands, Palau, Mariana Islands and Marshall Islands. The Japanese navy subsequently participated in the pursuit of the German East Asia Squadron through the Indian and Pacific oceans.

On 2 September 1914, the British requested that Japanese send naval units to the Mediterranean theater of operations, in order to counter the threat posed by the Ottoman and Austro-Hungarian navies as well as the German Mediterranean Division. Japan declined citing its involvement in the blockade of Tsingtao and the Pacific Ocean operations. On 4 November, Britain reiterated their proposal offering to support Japanese claims at the conclusion of the war. This proposal was refused after chief of national staff Shimamura Hayao voiced the opinion that the presence of a Japanese force at such a distance from the homeland would create a risk of an American invasion. The British persisted, approaching the Japanese naval attache in London in December 1914 and 13 January 1915, who promptly rebuffed them. Negotiations were resumed on 2 February 1916, whereupon it was agreed that Australia would sign the Anglo-Japanese Treaty of Commerce and Navigation, Japanese immigrants would be granted entry into Australia and New Zealand, and Japanese doctors would be allowed to practice in British colonies. The above concessions in tandem with the appointment of Terauchi Masatake (who advocated wider cooperation with the British) to the post of Prime Minister of Japan, led to the creation of the 1st Special Squadron that was tasked with escorting troopships from Australia and New Zealand to the Aden Protectorate as well as patrol duties on the same route. Japanese assistance was extended on 10 February 1917, when it was decided that a 2nd Special Squadron was to be created.

== 2nd Special Squadron ==
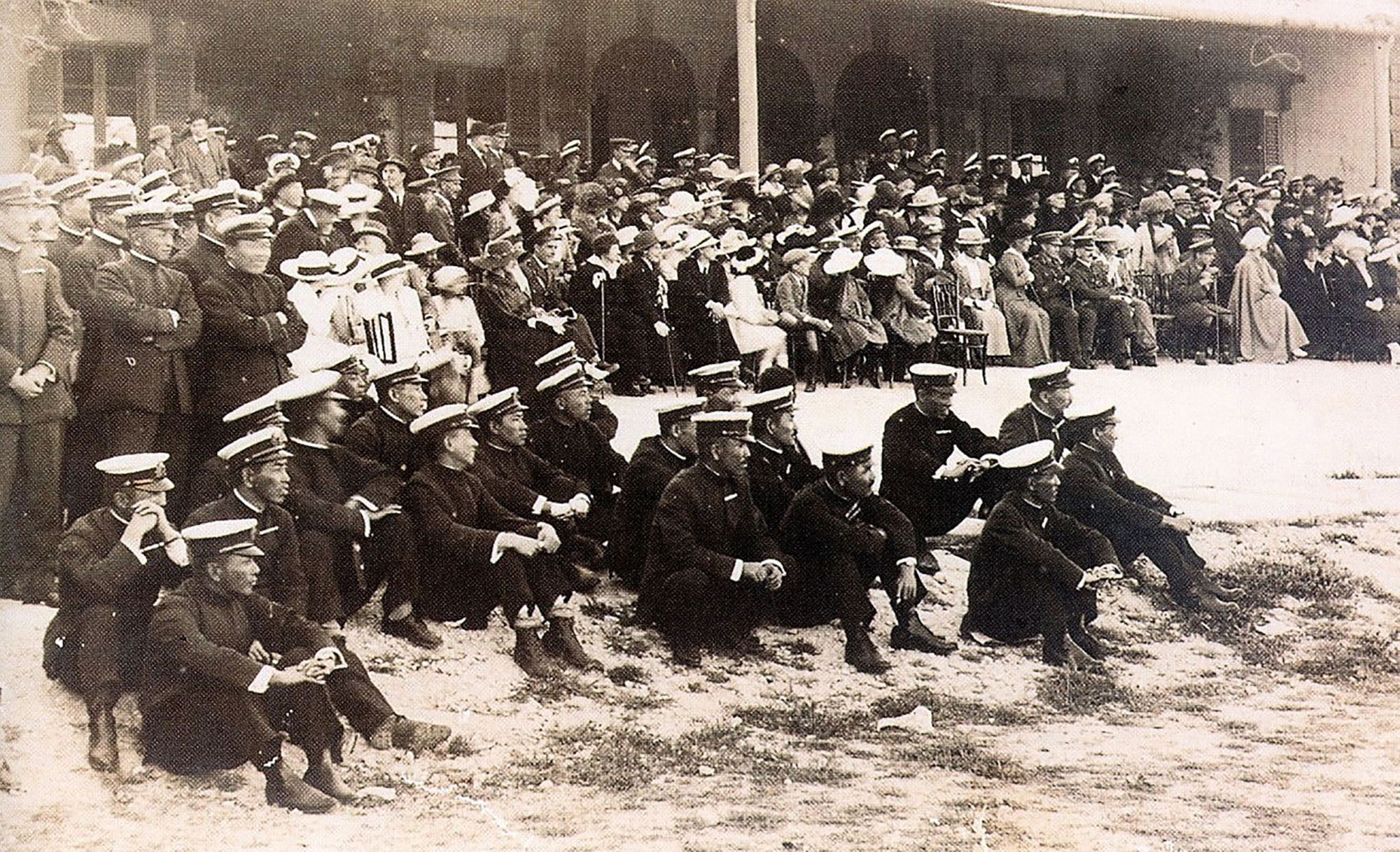
Imperial Japanese Navy officers at Marsa Race Court, Malta, 1919

The squadron was headed by the Suma-class cruiser Akashi, while also including the 10th (Ume, Kusunoki, Kaede, Katsura) and 11th (Kashiwa, Matsu, Sugi, and Sakaki) Destroyer Flotillas, consisting of 4 Kaba-class destroyers each. The 11th Flotilla departed Japan on 18 February 1917, joining the rest of the squadron in Singapore on 5 March, where Admiral Kōzō Satō assumed command. The squadron sailed through Colombo, Aden and Port Said, arriving at Malta on 16 April. The arrival of the squadron coincided with the peak of the unrestricted submarine warfare practiced by the Central Powers.

The Japanese were tasked with escorting troopships heading from Malta to Salonica and from Alexandria to Taranto and Marseille. On 4 May 1917, Sakaki and Matsu took part in the rescue of the passengers of British transport SS Transylvania, which was sinking after being torpedoed off the Gulf of Genoa, almost 3,000 people were saved. The British Admiralty later sent a telegram congratulating Satō for the service of his men on that occasion. In June 1917, Izumo-class cruiser Izumo relieved Akashi at Malta becoming the squadron's flagship. On 11 June 1917, Sakaki was torpedoed by Austro-Hungarian submarine SM U-27 off the coast of Crete, resulting in 59 deaths and 22 injuries. Sakaki was badly damaged, however she managed to reach the port of Pireaus. On 25 June 1917, the 15th Destroyers Flotilla comprised four Momo-class destroyers (Momo, Kashi, Hinoki, Yanagi) departed from Japan, joining the squadron in August 1917. On 27 August 1917, admiral superintendent of the Malta Dockyard George Alexander Ballard praised the operational capacity of the Japanese, favorably comparing them towards those of the French and Italians. In 1918, Kasuga-class cruiser Nisshin reinforced the squadron, becoming a flagship in November of the same year.

By the end of the war ships belonging to the squadron had accompanied 788 Allied ships, including transports carrying 700,000 troops. They engaged German and Austro–Hungarian submarines on 38 occasions failing however to sink any. In December 1918, Izumo, accompanied by the destroyers Hinoki and Yanagi, sailed from Malta to Scapa Flow to assume control of seven captured German U-boats as prizes of war. The crew of the ships took part in the 1919 Paris and London Victory Parades. They returned to Malta with the U-boats in March 1919 and Nisshin accompanied eight destroyers and the U-boats to Japan, while Izumo made port calls at Naples, Genoa and Marseille before arriving in Japan with the remaining destroyers on 2 July 1919.

A memorial commemorating the fallen servicemen from Sakaki was opened at the Kalkara Naval Cemetery in Malta.

=== Ships of the 2nd Special Squadron ===
Cruisers

Name	Image	Launched	Type
Akashi		18 December 1897	Suma class
Izumo		19 September 1898	Izumo class
Nisshin		9 February 1903	Kasuga class

10th Destroyer Division

Name	Image	Launched	Type
Ume	—	27 February 1915	Kaba class
Kusunoki	—	5 March 1915	Kaba class
Kaede	—	20 February 1915	Kaba class
Katsura		15 February 1915	Kaba class

11th Destroyer Division

Name	Image	Launched	Type
Kashiwa	—	14 February 1915	Kaba class
Matsu	—	5 March 1915	Kaba class
Sugi	—	16 February 1915	Kaba class
Sakaki		4 March 1915	Kaba class

15th Destroyer Division

Name	Image	Launched	Type
Momo	—	12 October 1916	Momo class
Kashi	—	1 December 1916	Momo class
Hinoki		25 December 1916	Momo class
Yanagi	—	24 February 1917	Momo class

Japanese crewed British ships

As the anti-submarine activities increased the Japanese were lent two Destroyers and two gunships.

Name	Image	Launched	Type
Sendan (栴檀)		2 February 1911 as HMS Minstrel	Acorn class
Kanran (橄欖)		9 August 1910 as HMS Nemesis	Acorn class
Gunboat Saikyo	—		
Gunboat Tokyo	—		

== See also ==
- 1st Special Squadron (Japanese Navy) - Fleet assigned to patrol Australia
- North American Task Force - Fleet assigned to patrol Canada and later the West Pacific
- Third Fleet (Imperial Japanese Navy) - Fleet assigned to patrol Russian coast during the Soviet Revolution
- 2nd Fleet (Imperial Japanese Navy) was a fleet of the Imperial Japanese Navy (IJN) created as a mobile strike force in response to hostilities with Russia, and saw action in every IJN military operation until the end of World War II.
- 1st Fleet (Imperial Japanese Navy)
