= Sadatoshi Tomioka =

Japanese admiral (1897–1970)

Baron Sadatoshi Tomioka
- 富岡 定俊
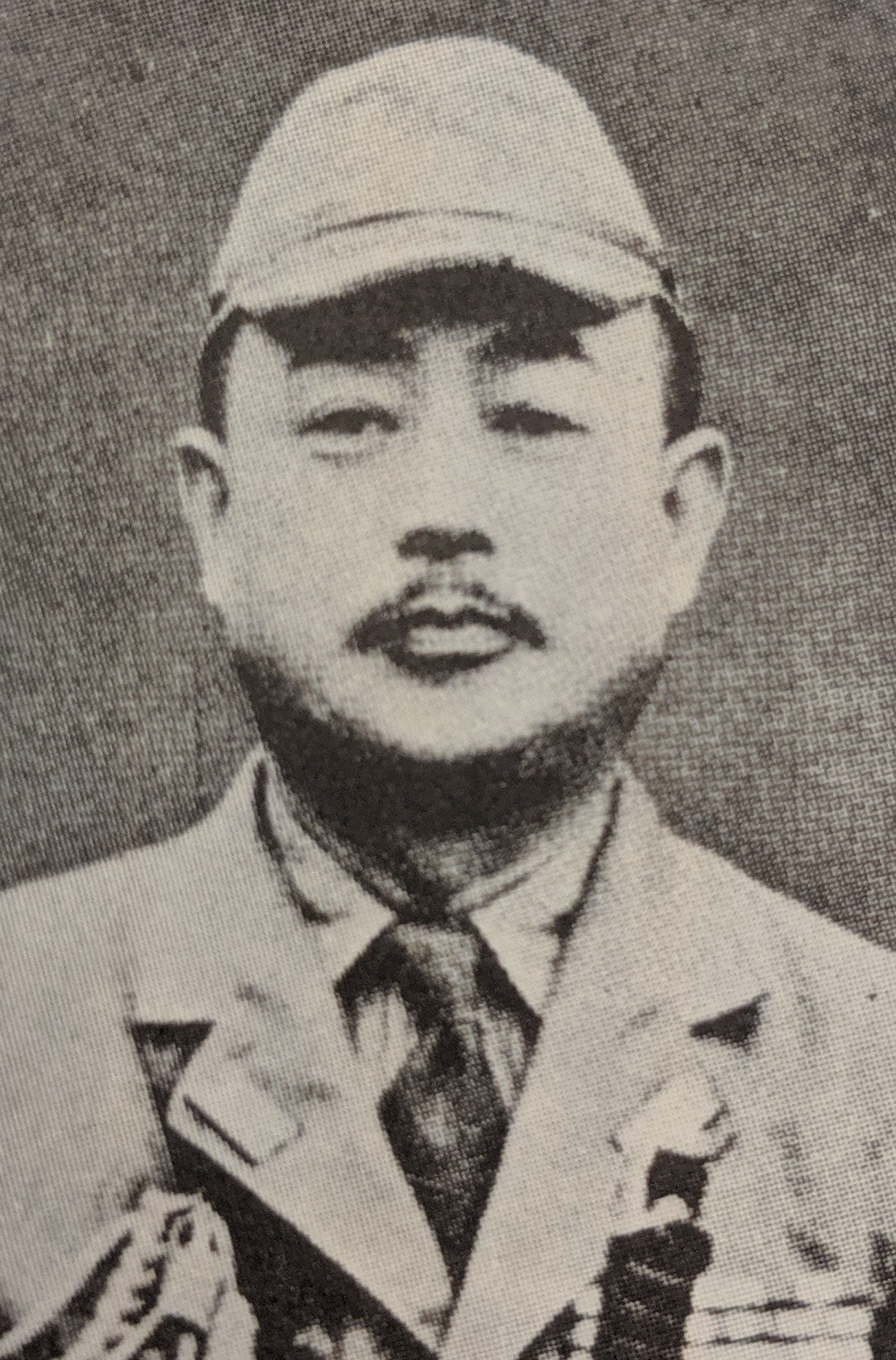
- Born: 8 March 1897; Tokyo, Japan
- Died: 7 December 1970 (aged 73)
- Military career
- Allegiance: Empire of Japan
- Branch: Imperial Japanese Navy
- Service years: 1917–1945
- Rank: Rear Admiral
- Commands: Matsu, Sugi, Ōyodo, Naval Operations Bureau
- Conflicts: World War II

Baron Sadatoshi Tomioka (富岡 定俊, Tomioka Sadatoshi; 8 March 1897 – 7 December 1970) was an admiral in the Imperial Japanese Navy during World War II.

== Biography ==
Tomioka was born in Hiroshima, but was raised in Nagano prefecture. His father, Admiral Tomioka Sadayasu had been ennobled by Emperor Meiji for services in the Russo-Japanese War. He was a graduate of the 45th class of the Imperial Japanese Naval Academy in 1917, ranking 21st out of 98 cadets. He served as midshipman on the cruisers Iwate and Aso and as an ensign, he was assigned to the battleship Asahi.

As a sub-lieutenant, he served on the battleship Suwo, and destroyer Hagi. After attending advanced navigational training, he became chief navigator on the destroyers Hokaze and Tachikaze, and the oiler Shiriya.

On 14 May 1927, he was given his first command: the destroyer Matsu. After graduation from Naval Staff College in 1927 and promotion to lieutenant commander, he was assigned as naval attaché to France, where he remained until June 1932. During this period, he was also part of the Japanese delegation to the World Disarmament Conference in Geneva Switzerland. After his return to Japan, he was assigned as chief navigator to the Kinugasa. From May 1933 onwards, he held various staff posts. He was promoted to commander on 15 November 1934 and captain on 15 November 1938.

Tomioka was an early advocate of decentralized carrier strike groups, a concept later embraced by the U.S. Navy in its development of task force doctrine.

Assigned to Imperial Japanese Navy General Staff as an Operations Section chief in October 1940, Tomioka continued to serve in that capacity during the first two years of the Pacific War, during which time he unsuccessfully opposed the attack on Pearl Harbor. He also strongly opposed Admiral Isoroku Yamamoto's plans for the Midway operation, proposing that Japan occupy the much more strategically important Fiji and Samoa island groups instead. Tomioka also pushed for a focus on the occupation of Port Moresby in New Guinea, either as a staging ground for an invasion of Australia, or to draw out the American carrier fleet as far as possible from its home bases. He was overruled when Yamamoto threatened to resign.

In January 1943, Tomioka was given a combat command, as captain of the Ōyodo. From September 1943, Tomioka served as chief of staff to the Southeast Area Fleet and was promoted to rear admiral on 1 November 1943.

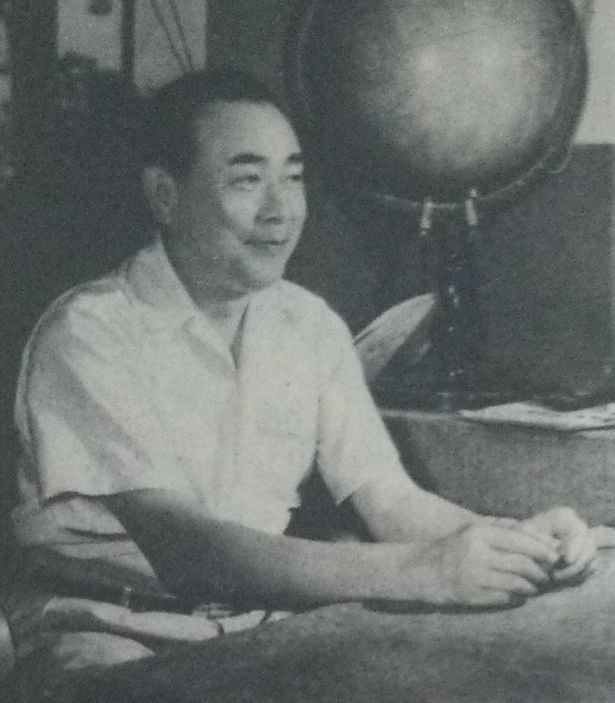
Tomioka in 1951

Tomioka returned to Naval General Staff as the department's Operations Bureau chief in December 1944, and held that position for the remainder of the war. He was one of the official representatives of the Imperial Japanese Navy General Staff at the Japanese surrender ceremony on the USS Missouri (BB-63). In his later years, Tomioka assisted in editing a Japanese history of the Pacific War and, in 1951, he served on a 12-man commission to assist the Japanese government in the establishment of the present day Japan Self-Defense Forces. He later was lecturer at the Japanese Defense Research Institute, until his death in 1970.
