= Sugi (disambiguation) =

Sugi is the common Japanese name for Cryptomeria (Japanese: 杉, Sugi), a monotypic genus of conifer in the cypress family

It may also refer to:

- Japanese ship Sugi, Japanese Navy ships
- Hiroki Sugimura, a character in Battle Royale
- SUGi, American conservation organization

== People ==
- Sugi Sito (1926–2000), Mexican professional wrestler
- Ryōtarō Sugi (born 1944), Japanese singer
- Takuya Sugi (born 1983), Japanese professional wrestler
- Yoshida Shōin (né Sugi Toranosuke, 1830–1859), Japanese politician
