= Japanese destroyer Kaba =

Two warships of Japan have borne the name Kaba:

- Japanese destroyer Kaba (1915), a Kaba-class destroyer launched in 1915 and struck in 1932
- Japanese destroyer Kaba (1945), a Tachibana-class destroyer launched in 1945 and scrapped in 1948
