= Japanese ship Sugi =

Several ships have been named Sugi (杉 / すぎ; "cedar") :

- Japanese destroyer Sugi (1915), a Kaba-class destroyer of the Imperial Japanese Navy during World War I
- Japanese destroyer Sugi (1944), a Matsu-class destroyer of the Imperial Japanese Navy during World War II
- JDS Sugi (PF-285), a Kusu-class patrol frigate of the Japan Maritime Self-Defense Force, formerly USS Coronado (PF-38)
- JS Sugi, a Sakura-class patrol ship of the Japan Maritime Self-Defense Force
