= Tomioka Sadayasu =

Japanese admiral

Baron Tomioka Sadayasu
- 富岡 定恭
- Born: December 24, 1854; Matsushiro, Nagano, Japan
- Died: July 1, 1917 (aged 62)
- Military career
- Allegiance: Empire of Japan
- Branch: Imperial Japanese Navy
- Service years: 1878–1911
- Rank: Vice Admiral
- Conflicts: First Sino-Japanese War; Russo-Japanese War

Baron Tomioka Sadayasu (富岡 定恭; 24 December 1854 – 1 July 1917) was an admiral of the early modern Imperial Japanese Navy.

== Biography ==
Tomioka was the eldest son of a samurai in the service of Matsushiro Domain, in what is now part of Nagano Prefecture.

In September 1876, Tomioka enrolled in the 5th class of the Imperial Japanese Naval Academy and graduated at the top of his class. In 1878 he was sent as a cadet to serve on the Royal Navy warship HMS Audacious. After his return to Japan, he graduated from the Navy Staff College. During the First Sino-Japanese War, Tomioka served as executive officer on the cruiser Itsukushima. He subsequently served as captain of the dispatch ship Tatsuta, instructor at the Imperial Japanese Naval Academy, captain of the cruiser Yakumo and of the battleship Shikishima and director of the 1st Bureau of the Imperial Japanese Navy General Staff.

Tomioka as a rear admiral

Tomioka was promoted to rear admiral in July 1903. During the Russo-Japanese War, he was on the same strategy planning team as Akiyama Saneyuki, and served as commandant of the Imperial Japanese Naval Academy. After the war, he was made commander in chief of the Training Fleet and promoted to vice admiral in March 1907.

Tomioka was ennobled with the title of baron (danshaku) under the kazoku peerage system in September 1907. After serving as commander in chief of the Takeshiki Guard District and the Ryojun Guard District, he entered the reserves in December 1911.

From 1914 until his death in July 1917, Tomioka was vice-chairman of the Imperial Serviceman's Association. His son Sadatoshi Tomioka was also an admiral, serving in World War II.
