= HMS Minstrel (1911) =

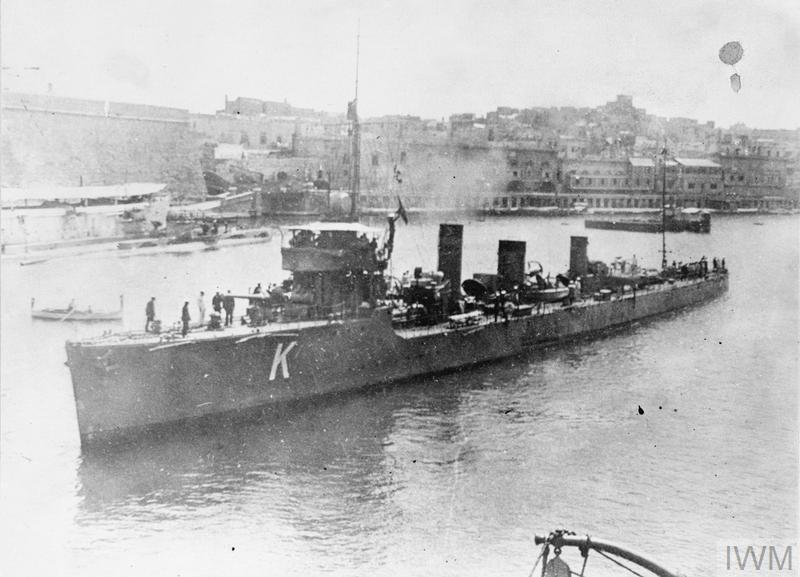
- The destroyer Sendan 栴檀（せんだん）(ex HMS Minstrel) at Marseilles in 1917

History

United Kingdom
- Name: HMS Minstrel
- Builder: John I. Thornycroft & Company, Woolston
- Laid down: 11 March 1910
- Launched: 2 February 1911
- Fate: Sold for breaking up 1 December 1921

Empire of Japan
- Name: Sendan (栴檀)（せんだん)
- Acquired: 20 September 1917
- Fate: 17 January 1919 and returned to the Royal Navy

General characteristics
- Class & type: Acorn-class destroyer
- Displacement: 772 tons
- Length: 246 ft (75.0 m)
- Beam: 25.2 ft (7.7 m)
- Draught: 8.5 ft (2.6 m)
- Propulsion: 4 Yarrow boilers, Parsons turbines, 13,500 shp (10,100 kW)
- Speed: 27 knots (50 km/h; 31 mph)
- Complement: 72
- Armament: 2 × BL 4-inch (101.6 mm) L/40 Mark VIII guns, mounting P Mark V; 2 × QF 12 pdr 12 cwt Mark I mounting P Mark I; 2 × 21-inch (533 mm) torpedo tubes

HMS Minstrel was an Acorn-class destroyer built by John I. Thornycroft & Company, Woolston, that was lent to the Imperial Japanese Navy (IJN) from 1917–1919. In the IJN she was named Sendan (栴檀)（せんだん).

== Construction and design ==
The British Admiralty ordered 20 Acorn-class destroyers as part of the 1909–1910 shipbuilding programme for the Royal Navy, with four (Larne, Lyra, Martin and Minstrel) ordered from John I. Thornycroft & Company.

Minstrel was 240 ft 0 in (73.15 m) long between perpendiculars and 246 ft 0 in (74.98 m) overall, with a beam of 25 ft 3 in (7.70 m) and a draught of between 7 ft 4 1/2 in (2.248 m) and 8 ft 10 in (2.69 m) depending on load. Displacement was 760 long tons (770 t) normal and 855 long tons (869 t) full load. (Note: Displacement was listed as 730 long tons (740 t) in Navy Lists.) The ship's machinery consisted of four Yarrow boilers feeding steam to Parsons steam turbines which drove three propeller shafts. The machinery was rated at 13,500 shaft horsepower (10,100 kW) giving a design speed of 27 knots (50 km/h; 31 mph). The ship had a crew of 72 officers and enlisted.

Gun armament consisted of two 4-inch (102 mm) BL Mk VIII guns, (Note: The abbreviation BL stood for Breech Loading. In British use it also indicated that the gun used a bagged charge, with QF (Quick Firing) meaning that the gun used a charge enclosed in a metal cartridge case.) one on the ship's forecastle and one aft, and two 12-pounder (76 mm) QF 12 cwt guns (Note: "Cwt" is the abbreviation for hundredweight, 12cwt referring to the weight of the gun.) carried in the waist position between the first two funnels. Torpedo armament consisted of two 21-inch (533 mm) torpedo tubes, with two reload torpedoes carried. The torpedo tubes were aft of the funnels, mounted singly with a searchlight position between them. By 1918, a 3-pounder (47 mm) anti aircraft gun was fitted, and depth charges were carried.

Minstrel was laid down at Thornycoft's Woolston, Southampton shipyard on 11 March 1910, and was launched on 2 February 1911. Minstrel reached a speed of 29.627 knots (54.869 km/h; 34.094 mph) during sea trials, and was completed in May 1911.

== Service ==
On commissioning, Minstrel, like the rest of her class, joined the 2nd Destroyer Flotilla, replacing the River-class destroyer Boyne in the flotilla, with the older destroyer transferring to the Nore Destroyer Flotilla. On 20 July 1911, Minstrel having been detached from her flotilla, (which was on passage from Cromarty to Portland) to make her way independently to Southampton, ran aground off Langston Bar. Her commanding officer, Commander William G. A. Kennedy, was court martialed over the grounding and found guilty of allowing his ship to be grounded by negligence, having failed to keep track of the ship's position and maintained an unnecessary speed of 18 knots (33 km/h; 21 mph). Kennedy was severely reprimanded.

On the outbreak of the First World War in August 1914, the 2nd Destroyer Flotilla, including Minstrel, joined the newly established Grand Fleet. The 2nd Flotilla's destroyers suffered frequent failures of the ship's steering gear during the winter of 1914–15. Minstrel remained part of the 2nd Destroyer Flotilla until December 1915, then transferring to the 5th Destroyer Flotilla, part of the Mediterranean Fleet, escorting troop transports on their passage to Malta.

On 20 September 1917 the destroyer was lent to the IJN 2nd Special Squadron and renamed Sendan (Eng: Chinese berry). She was assigned to the Sasebo Naval District on 19 November. Along with HMS Nemesis (as Kanran), she was listed as part of the Malta Flotilla of the British Mediterranean Fleet (under Japanese ensign, and manned by Japanese ratings) in the January, 1918, issue of The Navy List. She was released on 17 January 1919 and returned to the British Navy at Plymouth Harbour.

== Disposal ==
Following the end of the war, pre-war destroyers like the Acorns were quickly laid up into reserve. On 1 December 1921, she was sold for dismantling.
