= HMS Lyra (1910) =

Destroyer of the Royal Navy

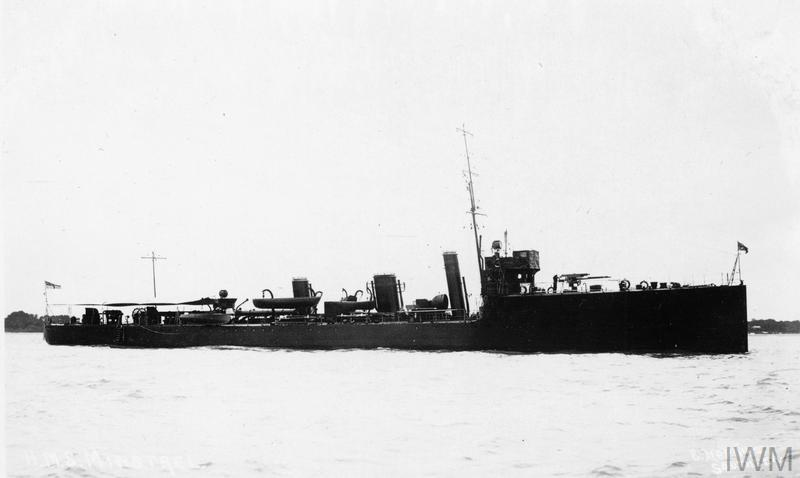
- Sister ship Minstrel

History

United Kingdom
- Name: Lyra
- Namesake: Lyra
- Builder: John I. Thornycroft & Company, Woolston
- Laid down: 8 December 1909
- Launched: 4 October 1910
- Completed: February 1911
- Out of service: 9 May 1921
- Fate: Sold to be broken up

General characteristics (as built)
- Class & type: Acorn-class destroyer
- Displacement: 730 long tons (740 t) (normal)
- Length: 246 ft (75 m) o.a.
- Beam: 25 ft 5 in (7.7 m)
- Draught: 8 ft 6 in (2.6 m)
- Installed power: 4 Yarrow boilers, 13,500 shp (10,100 kW)
- Propulsion: Parsons steam turbines, 3 shafts
- Speed: 27 kn (50 km/h; 31 mph)
- Range: 1,540 nmi (2,850 km; 1,770 mi) at 15 kn (28 km/h; 17 mph)
- Complement: 72
- Armament: 2 × single BL 4 in (102 mm) guns; 2 × single QF 12 pdr 3 in (76 mm) guns; 2 × single 21 in (533 mm) torpedo tubes

HMS Lyra was one of 20 Acorn class (later H-class) destroyers built for the Royal Navy that served in the First World War. The Acorn class were smaller than the preceding Beagle class but oil-fired and better armed. Launched in 1910, Lyra was part of the winning side in war games that took place the following year, although the destroyer sustained damage due to fast running. At the start of the war, the ship served with the Second Destroyer Flotilla of the Grand Fleet, and spent most of the war in anti-submarine warfare, mainly protecting merchant ships from attack. Despite being involved in many actions, the destroyer did not sink any enemy boats. Lyra ended the war in Gibraltar. After the Armistice, the destroyer was placed in reserve before being sold to be broken up in 1921.

== Design and description ==
After the preceding coal-burning Beagle class, the Acorn-class destroyer saw a return to oil-firing. Pioneered by the Tribal class of 1905 and HMS Swift of 1907, using oil enabled a more efficient design, leading to a smaller vessel which also had increased deck space available for weaponry. Unlike previous destroyer designs, where the individual yards had been given discretion within the parameters set by the Admiralty, the Acorn class were a set, with the machinery the only major variation between the different ships. This enabled costs to be reduced. The class was later renamed H class.

Lyra was 240-foot (73 m) long between perpendiculars and 246 ft (75 m) overall, with a beam of 25 ft 5 in (7.7 m) and a deep draught of 8 ft 6 in (2.6 m). Displacement was 730 long tons (820 short tons; 740 tonnes) normal and 855 long tons (869 t) full load. Power was provided by Parsons steam turbines, fed by four Yarrow boilers. Parsons supplied a complex of seven turbines, a high-pressure and two low pressure for high speed, two turbines for cruising and two for running astern, driving three shafts. The high-pressure turbine drove the centre shaft, the remainder being distributed amongst two wing-shafts. Three funnels were fitted, the foremost tall and thin, the central short and thick and the aft narrow. The engines were rated at 13,500 shaft horsepower (10,100 kW) and design speed was 27 knots (50 km/h; 31 mph). On trial, Lyra achieved 28.7 knots (53.2 km/h; 33.0 mph). The vessel carried 170 long tons (170 t) of fuel oil which gave a range of 1,540 nautical miles (2,850 km; 1,770 mi) at a cruising speed of 15 kn (28 km/h; 17 mph).

The more efficient use of deck space enabled a larger armament to be mounted. A single BL 4 in (102 mm) Mk VIII gun was carried on the forecastle and another aft. Two single QF 12-pounder 3 in (76 mm) guns were mounted between the first two funnels. Two rotating 21-inch (533 mm) torpedo tubes were mounted aft of the funnels, with two reloads carried, and a searchlight fitted between the tubes. The destroyer was later modified to carry a single Vickers QF 3-pounder 3 in (76 mm) anti-aircraft gun and depth charges for anti-submarine warfare. The ship's complement was 72 officers and ratings.

== Construction and career ==
The 20 destroyers of the Acorn class were ordered by the Admiralty under the 1909–1910 Naval Programme. One of three in the class sourced from John I. Thornycroft & Company, Lyra was laid down at the company's Woolston shipyard on 8 December 1909, launched on 4 October 1910 and completed in February 1911. The ship was the fourth ship in Royal Navy service to be named after the constellation.

Lyra joined the Second Destroyer Flotilla on 27 February 1911, replacing the destroyer Garry in the flotilla. On 7 April 1911, the ship ran aground on the west of the Orkney island of Gairsay, but sustained no damage. On 8 August 1911, the destroyer participated in a fleet exercise in the Irish Sea, pitting two fleets against each other. Despite being part of the winning "blue" fleet, the destroyer this time did suffer damage as the high speed manoeuvres meant that rivets were strained so much that the water entered the hull, mixing with oil in the bunkers. Lyra remained part of the Second Destroyer Flotilla in 1913.

In August 1914, the Flotilla became part of the Grand Fleet and the destroyers were deployed to Devonport to undertake escort duties. On 16 October, the vessel was leading four destroyers of the flotilla when the German submarine U-17 was sighted. The submarine had recently sunk the protected cruiser Hawke and lined up to torpedo Lyra and sister ship Nymphe too. Before the torpedo destined for Lyra could be launched, the destroyers raised the alarm and drove the submarine away. Not being equipped with depth charges, they could not attack a submerged target and the submarine escaped.

For much of the remainder of the war, Lyra was involved in escorting ships, both individually and in convoy. For example, on 3 December 1916, the vessel escorted troop ships to Liverpool. On 17 January 1917, Lyra was called on to escort more troops, this time destined for Sierra Leone. When returning from this on 22 January, the destroyer rescued the merchant ship SS Bendoran, which was being attacked by the German submarine U-57 on a voyage from Hong Kong. The destroyer drove the submarine away without loss of life on the submarine's intended victim, but one officer aboard Lyra was injured in a friendly fire incident, shot by accident by the QF 12 pounder aboard the Bendoran. Less successful was the defence of the Japanese Prince, sunk while under escort by the submarine UC-47 on 10 February. The destroyer did, however, save the crew. On 7 July, SS Bellucia was also torpedoed by UB-31 and lost off the coast of Cornwall. Once again, the submarine escaped, despite Lyra attacking with depth charges. A similar story unfolded on 7 August, when the destroyer drove away U-44 from attacking the troopship SS Orama without loss.

During 1918, the destroyer was transferred to the Mediterranean Fleet based at Gibraltar. Lyra formed part of the barrage across the Strait of Gibraltar, designed to detect and, if possible, sink German submarines returning from the Mediterranean Sea to their bases in the North Sea. On 8 November, the destroyer spotted what was thought to be a submarine and attacked, but the target escaped unscathed. After the Armistice, the Royal Navy returned to a peacetime level of strength and both the number of ships and personnel needed to be reduced to save money. Lyra was decommissioned and place in reserve at Portsmouth. The vessel was sold to be broken up at Milford Haven to Thos. W. Ward on 9 May 1921.

== Pennant numbers ==
Pennant number	Date
H60	December 1914
H67	January 1918
H97	January 1919
