= Japanese destroyer Sakaki (1915) =

Kaba-class destroyer

History

Empire of Japan
- Name: Sakaki
- Builder: Sasebo Naval Arsenal
- Launched: 15 February 1915
- Completed: 26 March 1915
- Decommissioned: 1 April 1932
- Stricken: November 1931
- Fate: Scrapped, 1932

General characteristics
- Class & type: Kaba-class destroyer
- Displacement: 655 long tons (666 t) (normal); 810 long tons (820 t) (full load)
- Length: 260 ft (79.2 m) (pp); 274 ft (83.5 m) (o/a)
- Beam: 24 ft (7.3 m)
- Draught: 7 ft 9 in (2.4 m)
- Installed power: 4 water-tube boilers; 9,500 ihp (7,100 kW)
- Propulsion: 3 shafts; 3 triple-expansion steam engines
- Speed: 30 knots (56 km/h; 35 mph)
- Range: 1,600 nmi (3,000 km; 1,800 mi) at 15 knots (28 km/h; 17 mph)
- Complement: 92
- Armament: 1 × single 12 cm (4.7 in) gun; 4 × single 3 in (76 mm) guns; 2 × twin 450 mm (17.7 in) torpedo tubes

Sakaki (榊, "Sakaki Tree" Cleyera japonica) was one of 10 Kaba-class destroyers built for the Imperial Japanese Navy during World War I. While operating in the Aegean Sea, Sakaki was torpedoed by an Austro-Hungarian U-boat in 1917.

== Design and description ==
The Kaba-class destroyers were improved versions of the preceding Sakura class. They displaced 665 long tons (676 t) at normal load and 850 long tons (860 t) at deep load. The ships had a length between perpendiculars of 260 feet (79.2 m) and an overall length of 274 feet (83.5 m), a beam of 24 feet (7.3 m) and a draught of 7 feet 9 inches (2.4 m). The Kabas were powered by three vertical triple-expansion steam engines, each driving one shaft using steam produced by four Kampon water-tube boilers. Two boilers burned a mixture of coal and fuel oil while the other pair only used oil. The engines produced a total of 9,500 indicated horsepower (7,100 kW) that gave the ships maximum speeds of 30 knots (56 km/h; 35 mph). They carried a maximum of 100 long tons (102 t) of coal and 137 long tons (139 t) of oil which gave them a range of 1,600 nautical miles (3,000 km; 1,800 mi) at speeds of 15 knots (28 km/h; 17 mph). Their crew consisted of 92 officers and ratings.

The main armament of the Kaba-class ships consisted of single quick-firing (QF) 12-centimetre (4.7 in) guns located on the bow. They were also armed with four QF 3-inch (76 mm) guns on single mounts. Two guns were positioned abreast the middle funnel, one gun was on the aft superstructure and the fourth gun was on the stern. The destroyers' torpedo armament consisted of two twin rotating mounts for 450-millimetre (17.7 in) torpedoes located between the superstructure and the stern gun.

== Construction and career ==
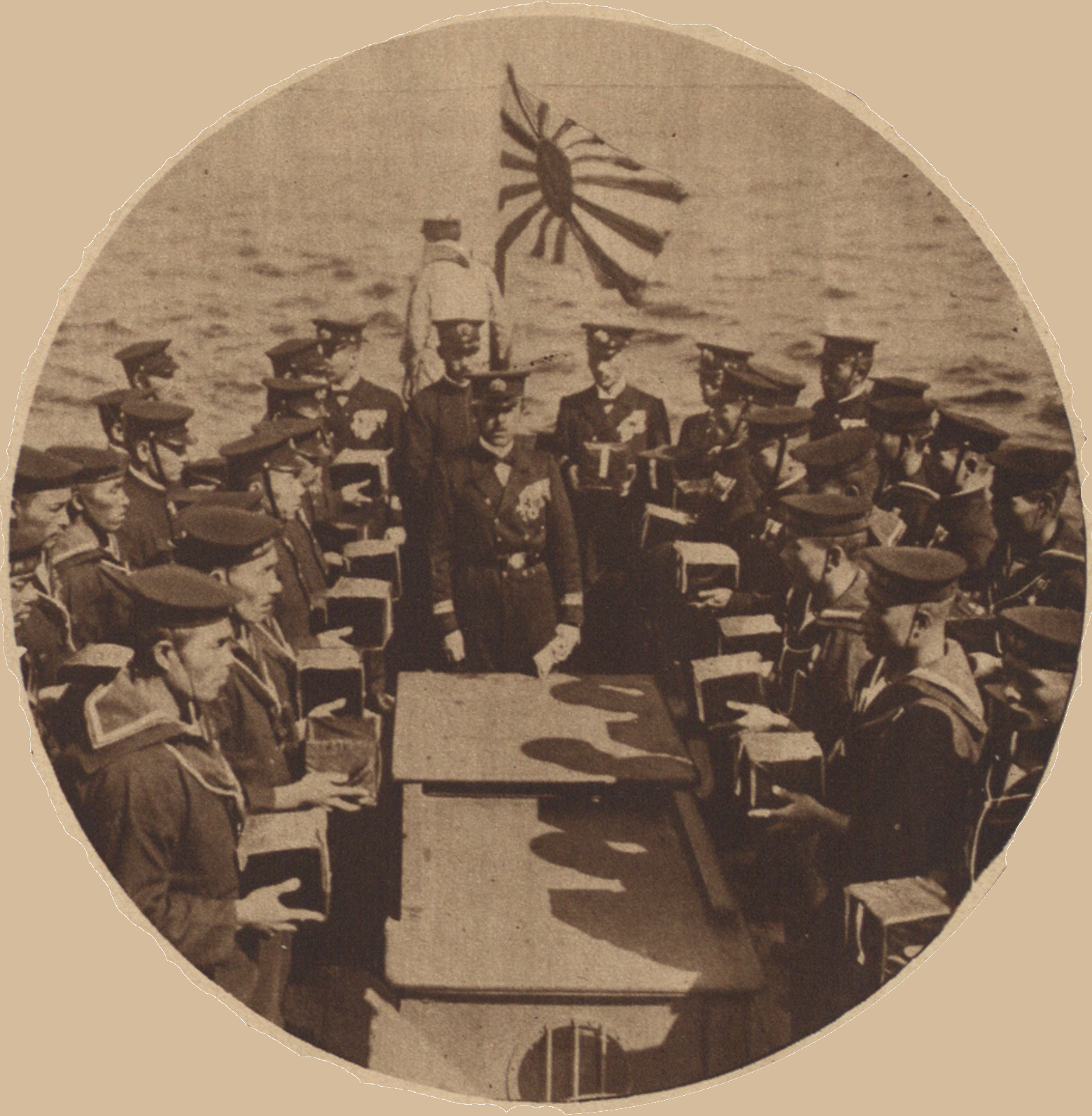
Japanese sailors bringing ashore boxes containing the cremated remains of the dead

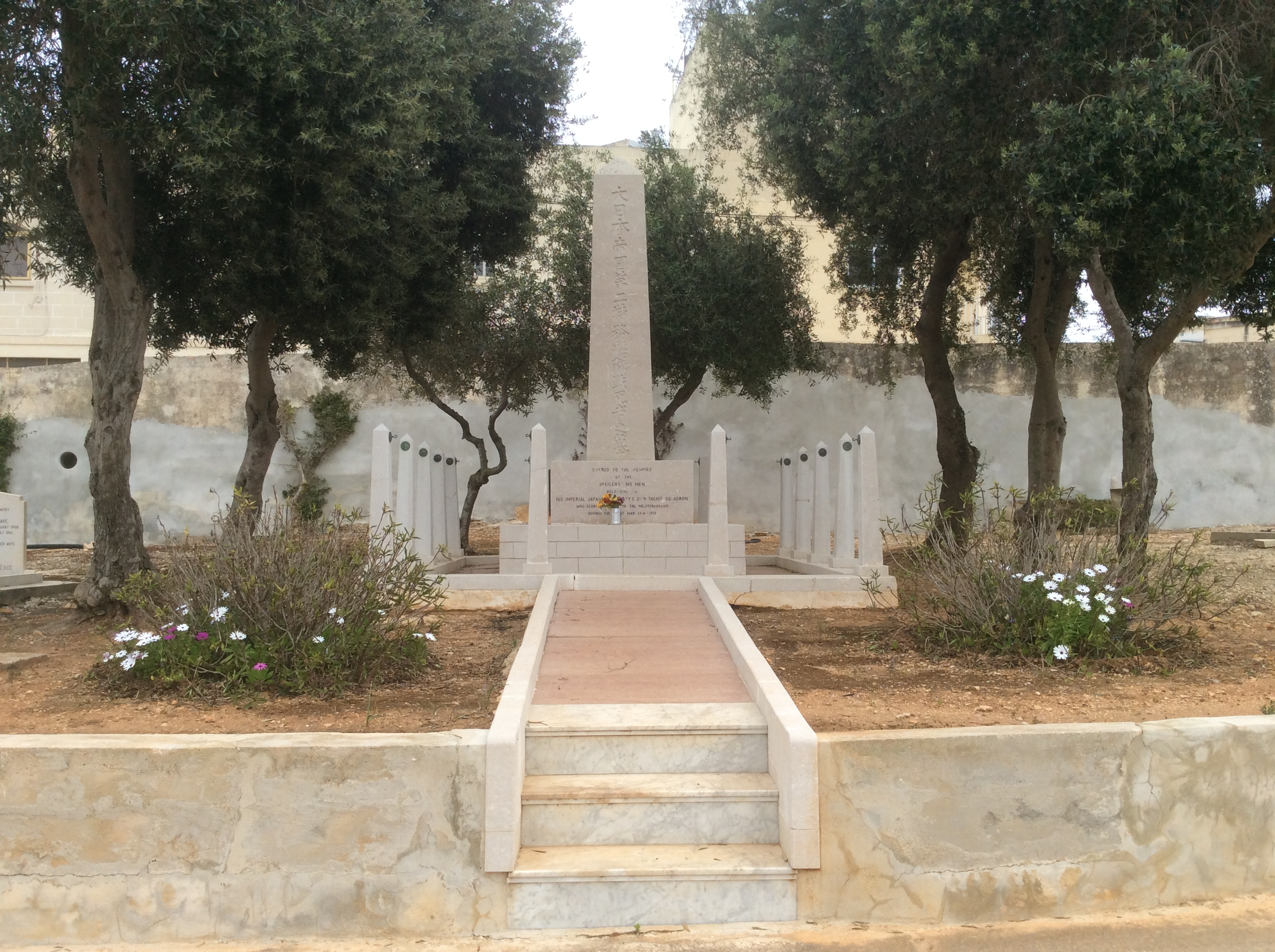
The Japanese Naval Memorial at Kalkara Naval Cemetery, Malta

Sakaki was launched on 15 February 1915 at the Sasebo Naval Arsenal and completed on 26 March. During World War I the ship patrolled the area around Singapore and later served as a convoy escort in the Mediterranean Sea.

While part of the Imperial Japanese 2nd Special Squadron helping Allies patrol in the Mediterranean Sakaki was torpedoed by the Austro-Hungarian submarine U-27 on 11 June 1917 in the Aegean Sea between Greece and Crete with the loss of 68 (Note: Authors Evan & Peattie say that 59 were killed.) of her 92 ratings, including her commander. She remained afloat, was salvaged and repaired. The Japanese Naval Memorial at Kalkara Naval Cemetery in Malta commemorates the casualties of the attack.

Sakaki was struck from the navy list in November 1931, decommissioned on 1 April 1932 and subsequently broken up.

== Bibliography ==
- Evans, David C. & Peattie, Mark (2015). Kaigun: Strategy, Tactics, and Technology in the Imperial Japanese Navy, 1887–1941. Naval Institute Press. ISBN 978-1-61251-425-3.
- Friedman, Norman (1985). "Japan". In Gardiner, Robert & Gray, Randal (eds.). Conway's All the World's Fighting Ships 1906–1921. Annapolis: Naval Institute Press. ISBN 0-87021-907-3.
- Friedman, Norman (2011). Naval Weapons of World War One. Barnsley, South Yorkshire, UK: Seaforth. ISBN 978-1-84832-100-7.
- Halpern, Paul G. (1995). A Naval History of World War I. UCL Press. ISBN 978-1-85728-498-0.
- Jentschura, Hansgeorg; Jung, Dieter & Mickel, Peter (1977). Warships of the Imperial Japanese Navy, 1869–1945. Annapolis, Maryland: United States Naval Institute. ISBN 0-87021-893-X.
- "Our Allies in their Common Cause". New-York Tribune. New York. 2 December 1917. pp. 1–10. ISSN 1941-0646. OCLC 9405688.
- Saxon, Timothy D. (Winter 2000). "Anglo-Japanese Naval Cooperation, 1914–1918". Naval War College Review. 53 (1). United States Naval War College: 62–92. ISSN 0028-1484. LCCN 75617787. OCLC 01779130.
- Todaka, Kazushige; Fukui, Shizuo; Eldridge, Robert D. & Leonard, Graham B. (2020). Destroyers: Selected Photos from the Archives of the Kure Maritime Museum; the Best from the Collection of Shizuo Fukui's Photos of Japanese Warships. Japanese Naval Warship Photo Album. Annapolis, Maryland: Naval Institute Press. ISBN 978-1-59114-630-8.
- Tucker, Spencer C & Mary, Priscilla (2005). World War I: Encyclopedia, Volume 1. ABC-CLIO. ISBN 978-1-85109-420-2.
- Watts, Anthony J. & Gordon, Brian G. (1971). The Imperial Japanese Navy. London: Macdonald. ISBN 0-35603-045-8.
