= North American Task Force =

IJN North American Task Force
- Active: 1914–1918
- Country: Japan
- Branch: Imperial Japanese Navy
- Type: Fleet
- Role: Protection of Western Canada
- Part of: Commander, Japanese Command

The IJN North American Task Force (遣米支隊, Kenbei Shitai) was an Imperial Japanese Navy fleet. In accordance with the Anglo-Japanese Alliance, the fleet defended the West Coast of Canada as well as Allied shipping in the Pacific during World War I.

== Background ==
As Canada emerged from the 19th century it still depended on the British Royal Navy for maritime defence. As the British and the Germans entered a naval arms race; the British, concerned that the Germans would outproduce them, asked their Dominion governments to contribute financially to the building of new ships at the 1909 Imperial Conference. This request imposed upon the Canadian Prime Minister Sir Wilfrid Laurier became known as the "naval question". Due to internal conflicts Laurier decided that, instead of giving money to the British Royal Navy, Canada would build its own Navy. A few ships were built or bought by the fledgling Canadian Navy founded in 1910 but the decision was unpopular in Canada and contributed to the downfall of the Laurier government.

In the years leading up to World War I, Japan increased its presence near the West coast of North America. In early 1914, Japanese cruisers sailed the Pacific coast of America and Canada with a significant number visiting Canada's west coast, including Asama and Azuma which visited Vancouver in June 1914. The ships and Vice-Admiral Kuroi, his captains, staff and the cadets were given a reception by the provincial government. The band of the 88th Fusiliers played for the occasion.

== First World War ==
When World War I broke out in 1914, Canada's outdated ships were tasked with defence of the Atlantic shipping lifeline to the UK. The Royal Navy decided to concentrate on the Atlantic theatre with the defence of Canada's west coast left to its ally, Imperial Japan. Newspapers at the time claimed that if it was not for the Japanese Navy the German Imperial Navy would have "shelled Victoria and Vancouver to fragments." Also on British request, the Japanese navy sent one or two cruisers from Vladivostok to Vancouver to assist in the transport of gold bullion.

== See also ==
- 1st Special Squadron (Japanese Navy) - Fleet assigned to patrol Australia
- 2nd Special Squadron (Japanese Navy) - Fleet assigned to patrol Mediterranean
- Third Fleet (Imperial Japanese Navy) - Fleet assigned to patrol Russian coast during the Soviet Revolution
- 2nd Fleet (Imperial Japanese Navy) was a fleet of the Imperial Japanese Navy (IJN) created as a mobile strike force in response to hostilities with Russia, and saw action in every IJN military operation until the end of World War II.
- 1st Fleet (Imperial Japanese Navy)
