= Kōzō Satō =

Japanese admiral (1871–1948)

- 佐藤 皐蔵
- Born: 15 May 1871; Hanamaki, Iwate, Japan
- Died: 23 March 1948 (aged 76)
- Military career
- Allegiance: Empire of Japan
- Branch: Imperial Japanese Navy
- Service years: 1891–1923
- Rank: Vice Admiral
- Commands: Suzuya, Tone, Azuma, Fusō; Imperial Japanese Navy Academy; 2nd Special Task Fleet; Ōminato Guard District
- Conflicts: First Sino-Japanese War; Russo-Japanese War; World War I

Kōzō Satō (佐藤 皐蔵, Satō Kōzō; May 15, 1871 – March 23, 1948) was a Japanese admiral in the Imperial Japanese Navy during World War I.

== Biography ==
Satō was born in Hanamaki city in modern-day Iwate prefecture. He was a graduate of the 18th class of the Imperial Japanese Naval Academy in 1891, ranking 6th out of 61 cadets. His classmates included future admiral Abo Kiyokazu.

As a midshipman, Satō served on Hiei, Katsuragi, Takachiho, and Hashidate, and after promotion to ensign, on the Amagi. In 1894, during the First Sino-Japanese War, he was assistant navigator on the converted passenger liner Saikyō-Maru, serving under the formidable Admiral Kabayama Sukenori during the Battle of the Yalu River.

After serving on Atago and Kaimon, Satō was promoted to lieutenant in 1897 and was appointed as chief gunnery officer on Chin'en in 1898. In 1900, he served on the Hatsuse on its voyage to the United Kingdom and back. He served in staff positions from 1901–1902, and was sent as a military attaché to the United Kingdom in April 1903. While in the United Kingdom, he was promoted to lieutenant commander.

After his return in February 1904, Satō was assigned as chief gunnery officer on Azuma, where he served during the Russo-Japanese War at the Battle off Ulsan. He was transferred to Tokiwa, where he was chief gunnery officer during the Battle of Tsushima. After the end of the war, he served on the battleship Katori on its 1905 voyage to the United Kingdom. Returning to Japan in August 1906, he was promoted to commander and served as an instructor at the Naval Gunnery School from 1907 to the end of 1909.

In December 1910,Satō became executive officer on the battleship Aki. On December 1, 1911, he was promoted to captain and received his first command: the cruiser Suzuya. He subsequently commanded Tone (1913), Azuma (1913) and Fusō (1915). Satō was promoted to rear admiral on Dec 1, 1916.

On February 7, 1917 Satō was assigned command of the 2nd Special Squadron, a task force of Japanese destroyers deployed to Malta in the Mediterranean as part of Japan’s assistance to the Allied war effort under the Anglo-Japanese Alliance. Sato commanded two squadrons of 17 destroyers from aboard the flagship Akashi, patrolling the eastern Mediterranean from Alexandria to Marseille and from Alexandria to Taranto against the Imperial German Navy and Austro-Hungarian Navy. His forces escorted convoys of merchant vessels and troopships, and performed anti-submarine warfare duties. Future admirals Tamon Yamaguchi and Raizō Tanaka were members of his staff. These operations were under the overall command of Royal Navy Admiral Sir Somerset Gough-Calthorpe, and Rear Admiral George A Ballard, who highly praised Satō in dispatches to London. The Japanese ships were at sea on combat duty on average 25 days or more each month. The Japanese Navy spent 72 percent of their time at sea compared with 60 percent by the British and about 45 percent by the French and Italian Navy.

After his return to Japan after the end of the war, Satō was commandant of the Naval Artillery School. He was promoted to vice admiral in December 1920, and commanded the Ōminato Guard District in 1921. He went into the reserves from 1923.

Satō died after the end of World War II in 1948. Many of the overseas honors and decorations he was awarded by the Entente Powers in World War I are displayed at the Hanamaki City Museum at his hometown of Hanamaki, Iwate. These include the following:

- Order of St Michael and St George (UK), Knight Commander
- Order of the Crown (Belgium), Grand Officer
- Order of the Redeemer (Greece), Grand Commander
- Legion of Honour (France), Commandeurs
- Order of the Crown of Italy, Grand Officer
