= Japanese cruiser Akashi =

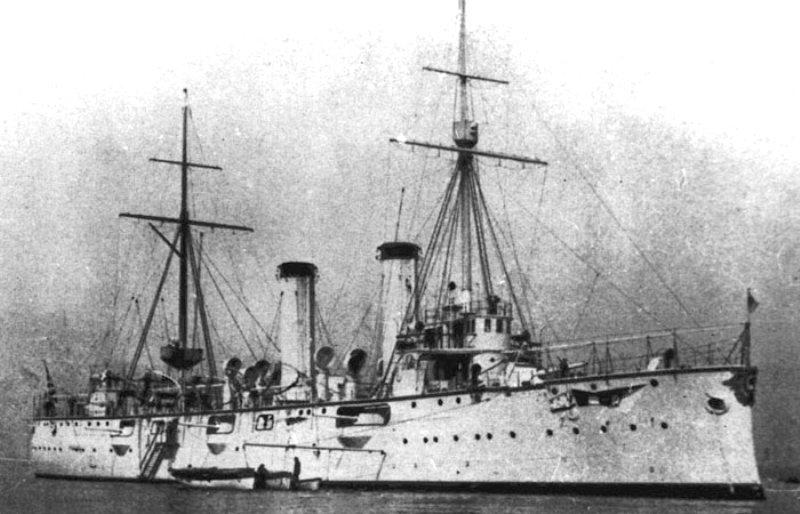
- Akashi in 1894

History

Empire of Japan
- Name: Akashi
- Ordered: 1893 Fiscal Year
- Builder: Yokosuka Naval Arsenal
- Laid down: 6 August 1894
- Launched: 18 December 1897
- Completed: 30 March 1899
- Stricken: 1 April 1928
- Fate: Expended as target, 3 August 1930

General characteristics
- Class & type: Suma-class cruiser
- Displacement: 2,657 long tons (2,700 t)
- Length: 93.5 m (306 ft 9 in)
- Beam: 12.3 m (40 ft 4 in)
- Draught: 4.6 m (15 ft 1 in)
- Propulsion: 2-shaft VTE reciprocating engines; 9 boilers; 7,890 hp (5,880 kW)
- Speed: 19.5 knots (22.4 mph; 36.1 km/h)
- Range: 11,000 nmi (20,000 km) at 10 kn (19 km/h)
- Complement: 256
- Armament: 2 × QF 6 inch /40 naval guns; 6 × QF 4.7-inch Gun Mk I–IV; 12 × QF 3 pounder Hotchkiss guns; 4 × Maxim guns; 2 × 356 mm (14 in) torpedo tubes
- Armour: Deck: 50 mm (2 in) (slope), 25 mm (1 in) (flat); Gun shield: 115 mm (4.5 in) (front)

Akashi (明石) was a Suma-class cruiser protected cruiser of the Imperial Japanese Navy. She was a sister ship to Suma. The name Akashi comes from an ancient name for a portion of the coastline near the modern city of Kobe in Hyōgo Prefecture.

== Background ==
Akashi was designed and built at Yokosuka Naval Arsenal, as part of an Imperial Japanese Navy program to end its dependence on foreign powers for modern warships, using an all-Japanese design and all-Japanese materials. Construction took four years, from 1892–1896. She was laid down on 6 August 1894, launched on 18 December 1897 and completed on 30 March 1899. While more lightly armed and armored than many of the cruiser's contemporaries, her small size and relatively simple design facilitated the vessel's construction and the ship's relatively high speed made her useful for many military operations. However, as with most Japanese designs of the period, she proved to be top-heavy and had issues with seaworthiness and stability.

== Design ==
The design for Akashi was based on an all-steel, double-bottomed hull, with an armored deck, divided underneath by watertight bulkheads. The armor, of the Harvey armor variety, covered only vital areas, such as the boilers, gun magazines and critical machinery, with a thickness of 25 millimetres (0.98 in) on the deck.

Her main battery consisted of two QF 6 inch /40 naval guns, one set in the forecastle and one in the stern. The main guns had a range of up to 9,100 metres (4.9 nmi) with a nominal firing rate of 5.7 shots/minute. Secondary armament consisted of six QF 4.7-inch guns mounted in sponsons on the upper deck. These guns had a range of up to 9,000 metres (4.9 nmi) with a nominal firing rate of 12 shots/minute. She also had ten QF 3 pounder Hotchkiss guns, with a range of up to 6,000 metres (3.2 nmi) with a nominal firing rate of 20 shots/minute, mounted four on the upper deck, two on the poop, two on the after bridge and one each on the bow and stern, as well as four 1-inch Nordenfelt guns, which were later replaced by four 7.62 mm Maxim machine guns. She also was equipped with two 356 mm (14 in) torpedoes, mounted on the deck.

Her powerplant consisted of two vertical triple expansion steam engines, with nine single-ended boilers in two boiler rooms separated by a watertight bulkhead .

The stability problems experienced by Suma was discovered before the completion of Akashi, and she was modified during construction with greater freeboard amidships, a flush deck, and without fighting tops to lower her center of gravity.

== Service life ==
=== Early years ===
After entering service in March 1899, Akashi experienced numerous mechanical problems and had to return to Yokosuka Naval Arsenal for repairs in October 1899 and January 1900, with additional repairs performed at Kure Naval Arsenal in May 1900 and at Sasebo Naval Arsenal in July 1900.

The first overseas deployment of Akashi was from July to November 1900, to support Japanese naval landing forces which occupied the port city of Tianjin in northern China during the Boxer Rebellion, as part of the Japanese contribution to the Eight-Nation Alliance.

Immediately on her return, she required repairs to her boilers at Kure. From April to October 1901, Akashi was sent to southern China, and was then again renovated in Kure. From February 1902, Akashi was again deployed to China but was forced once more to cut her deployment short when it was found that three of her boilers could not hold pressure, and she could not achieve over 14 knots (26 km/h; 16 mph). She returned to China in May, but had to return to Japan again in June. In August 1902, Akashi was deemed unfit for front-line service and was transferred to the reserve fleet.

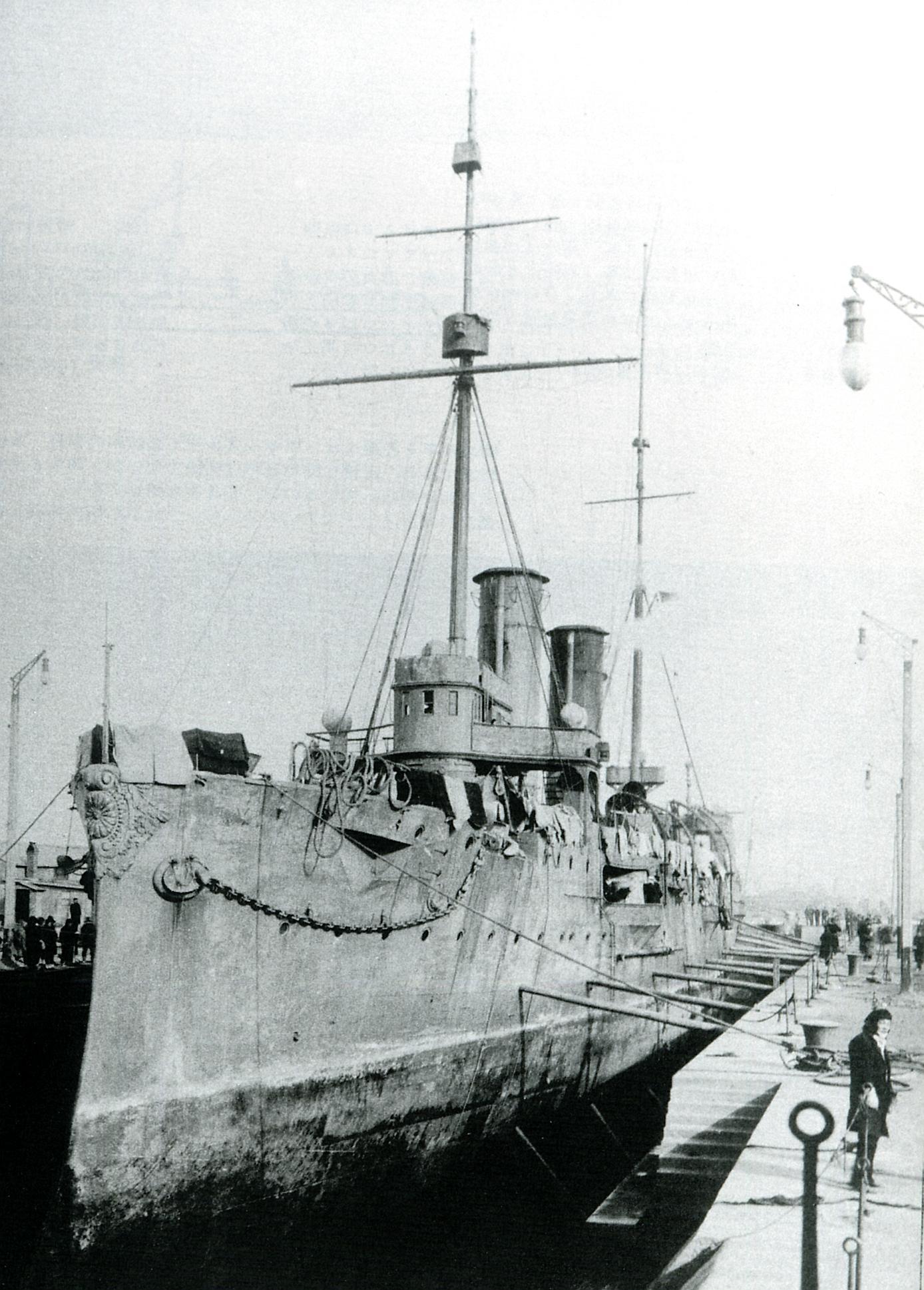
In drydock, 1905.

Unwilling to write off the ship as a loss, the Imperial Japanese Navy General Staff ordered Akashi to be completely overhauled at Kure Naval Arsenal in March 1903, and then sent the ship as a training vessel with instructors and cadets from the Imperial Naval Engineering Academy on a cruise around the coasts of China and Korea, marking port calls at Fuzhou, Shanghai, Yantai, Inchon, Busan and Wonsan, returning to Sasebo in September 1903. In October and November 1903, Akashi was able to participate in combat maneuvers with other cruisers in the fleet. Akashi was then assigned to escorting the Japanese cable laying vessels laying the first submarine telegraph cable between Sasebo and Incheon in Korea from 8–17 January 1904. During speed trials conducted in January 1904, Akashi attained a top speed of 19.5 knots (36.1 km/h; 22.4 mph).

=== Russo-Japanese War ===
Akashi was based at Chinkai Guard District in Korea at the start of the Russo-Japanese War of 1904–1905, and was stationed at sea off the southeastern coast of the Korean Peninsula as a telegraphic relay station immediately before the outbreak of hostilities. She participated in the Battle of Chemulpo Bay at the start of the war, taking part in the line of battle behind the cruiser Takachiho and assisting in the sinking of the Russian cruiser Varyag and the gunboat Korietz. During the battle, a shell from Varyag passed in between her funnels.

In April and May, Akashi escorted transports conveying the Japanese Second Army to Manchuria, and escorted destroyer squadrons from Japan to the front-lines. On 15 May, she assisted in the rescue of survivors from the crew of the ill-fated battleships Hatsuse and Yashima after those ships struck naval mines off the coast of Port Arthur. She then joined the list of Japanese ships blockading the Russian naval base in the Battle of Port Arthur.

On 16 May, Akashi, with the cruiser Akitsushima and Chiyoda, bombarded Russian troops and buildings from the Bohai Gulf. The operation was cancelled due to dense fog on 17 May, in which the gunboats Ōshima and Akagi collided, causing Ōshima to sink.

On 7 June, Akashi, together with Suma and the gunboats Uji, and a detachment of destroyers entered the Gulf of Bohai to support the landings of elements of the Japanese Second Army, and later bombarded Russian shore installations and a railway line along the coast of Manchuria.

On 10 August, during the Battle of the Yellow Sea, Akashi did not participate in the first phase of the battle as she arrived too late. However, she did participate in the pursuit of the fleeing Russian cruisers Askold and Novik, but was unable to prevent the escape of the Russian ships.

On 10 December, Akashi struck a naval mine while patrolling off of Port Arthur. The explosion blew a large hole in her bow, flooding several compartments, and creating a strong list to starboard. Because of the ice on the upper deck and darkness at night, the rescue attempt was difficult, but the crew was able to stabilize the ship, and accompanied by the cruisers Itsukushima and Hashidate, reached Dalian for repairs.

During the Battle of Tsushima on 27 May 1905, Akashi was under the 4th Combat Detachment headed by Rear Admiral Uryu Sotokichi and consisting of the Akashi, Naniwa, Takachiho, and Suma. On the discovery of the Russian fleet, the 4th Detachment attacked Russian transports and the cruisers Oleg, Aurora, Vladimir Monomakh and Dmitrii Donskoi, and sinking the already damaged battleship Knyaz Suvorov and repair ship Kamchatka. During the battle, Akashi took five rounds, which knocked her smokestack overboard, killed three crewmen and injured seven more. The following morning, Akashi was initially delayed due to repair work, but joined in the search for the remaining Russian vessels, assisting in the sinking of the armored cruisers Dmitrii Donskoi and Svetlana. She returned with the captured Russian destroyer Biedovy to Sasebo on 30 May.

After the battle, on 14 June, "Akashi" returned to Takeshiki Guard District to start patrols of the Korea Strait. She was overhauled at Kure Naval Arsenal from 4–29 July. On 10 October, Akashi intercepted the German-flagged steamer, M Struve (1582 tons), which was attempting to smuggle a cargo of rice, salt, bread and flour to Vladivostok. The steamer was sent with a prize crew to Sasebo.

Akashi arrived in Yokohama to participate in a naval review celebrating the Japanese victory on 23 October 1905.

=== World War I ===
From 1908–1909, future Prime Minister of Japan Suzuki Kantarō served as captain of Akashi. In 1912, Akashi was re-boilered, with her nine horizontal locomotive-style boilers replaced with nine Niclausse boilers.

In World War I, Akashi was part of the IJN 2nd Fleet in combat against the Imperial German Navy at the Battle of Tsingtao. In 1916, she was assigned to patrol the sea lanes from Borneo to the Malacca Straits and eastern Indian Ocean against German commerce raiders, as part of Japan's contribution to the Allied war effort under the Anglo-Japanese Alliance, and was based at Singapore.

Rear-Admiral Kōzō Satō commanded the 2nd Special Squadron with Akashi as flagship with the 10th and 11th Destroyer Units (eight destroyers) based at Malta from 13 April 1917. He was reinforced by the 15th Destroyer Unit with four more destroyers from 1 June 1917 to carry out on direct escort duties for Allied troop transports in the Mediterranean. After being relieved by the cruiser Izumo, Akashi returned to Japanese home waters, where she spent the remainder of the war.

After the end of the war, Akashi was re-designated as a 2nd class coastal defense vessel from 1 September 1921. She was removed from the navy list on 1 April 1928. Deemed obsolete, she was expended as a target for dive bombers south of Izu Ōshima on 3 August 1930.

The main mast of Akashi is preserved at the Japan Maritime Self Defense Academy at Etajima, Hiroshima.
