= HMS Nemesis (1910) =

Destroyer of the Royal Navy

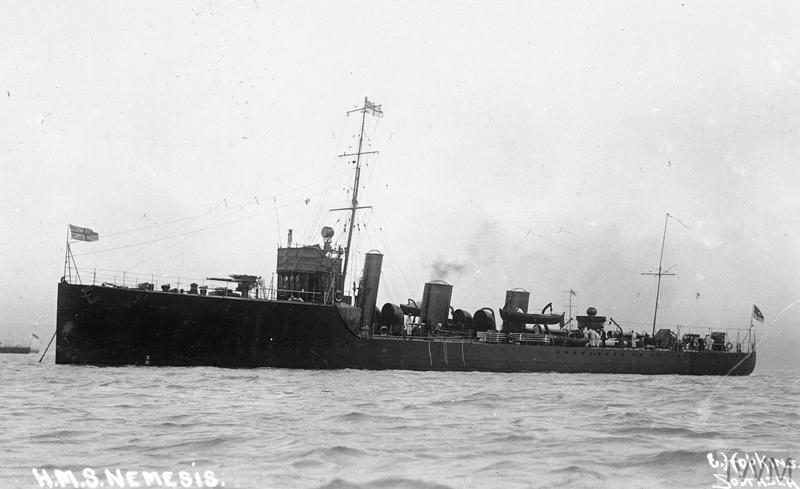
- Nemesis

History

United Kingdom
- Name: Nemesis
- Ordered: 8 September 1909
- Builder: Hawthorne, Hebburn
- Yard number: 434
- Laid down: 26 November 1909
- Launched: 9 August 1910
- Completed: 7 March 1911
- Out of service: 1 November 1921
- Fate: Sold to be broken up

General characteristics (as built)
- Class & type: Acorn-class destroyer
- Displacement: 748 long tons (760 t) normal
- Length: 246 ft (75 m) o.a.
- Beam: 25 ft 5 in (7.7 m)
- Draught: 8 ft 6 in (2.6 m)
- Installed power: 4 Yarrow boilers 13,500 shp (10,100 kW)
- Propulsion: Parsons steam turbines, 3 shafts
- Speed: 27 kn (50 km/h; 31 mph)
- Range: 1,540 nmi (2,850 km; 1,770 mi) at 15 kn (28 km/h; 17 mph)
- Complement: 72
- Armament: 2 × single BL 4 in (102 mm) guns; 2 × single QF 12 pdr 3 in (76 mm) guns; 2 × single 21 in (533 mm) torpedo tubes

HMS Nemesis was an Acorn-class (later H-class) destroyer that served with the Royal Navy and Imperial Japanese Navy in the First World War. The Acorn class ships were smaller than the preceding Beagle class but were oil-fired and better armed. Launched in 1910, Nemesis served with the Second Destroyer Flotilla based at Scapa Flow. The vessel served as part of the Grand Fleet, taking part in exercises, and as an escort deployed at Devonport protecting shipping against submarines. Nemesis was undamaged by enemy action, despite a near-miss from a torpedo launched by the German submarine U-9, but was damaged in a collision with sister ship Nymphe. After a period with the Mediterranean Fleet, in 1917, the destroyer was loaned to the Imperial Japanese Navy with the new name Kanran. Crewed by Japanese sailors, Kanran joined the 11th Japanese Destroyer Division and spent the remainder of the war escorting ships crossing the Mediterranean Sea. After the Armistice, the destroyer was returned to Royal Navy service in 1919 but was reduced to reserve before being sold to be broken up in 1921.

== Design and development ==
The first decade of the twentieth century saw dramatic strides in the development of destroyers, and the Royal Navy demanded more powerful designs capable of independent operation. The coal-burning Beagle class was followed by the Acorn class, which saw the Navy return to oil-firing. Pioneered by the Tribal class of 1905 and HMS Swift of 1907, using oil enabled a more efficient design, leading to a smaller vessel which also had increased deck space available for weaponry. In addition, unlike previous destroyer designs, where the individual yards had been given discretion within the parameters set by the Admiralty, the Acorn class was a set, with the propulsion machinery the only major variation between the different ships. This enabled costs to be reduced. The class was renamed H class in October 1913.

Nemesis was 240 feet (73 metres) long between perpendiculars and 246 ft (75 m) overall, with a beam of 25 ft 5 in (7.7 m) and a deep draught of 8 ft 6 in (2.6 m). Displacement was 748 long tons (838 short tons; 760 tonnes) normal and 855 long tons (958 short tons; 869 t) full load. Power was provided by Parsons steam turbines, fed by four Yarrow boilers. Parsons supplied a complex of high-pressure and low pressure turbines, driving three shafts. The engines were rated at 13,500 shaft horsepower (10,100 kW) and design speed was 27 knots (50 km/h; 31 mph). Three funnels were fitted. The vessel carried 170 long tons (170 t) of fuel oil and had a design range of 1,540 nautical miles (2,850 km; 1,770 mi) at a cruising speed of 15 kn (28 km/h; 17 mph).

The armament consisted of a single BL 4 in (102 mm) Mk VIII gun carried on the forecastle and another aft. Two single QF 12-pounder 3 in (76 mm) guns were mounted between the first two funnels. Two rotating 21-inch (533 mm) torpedo tubes were mounted aft of the funnels, with two reloads carried. A searchlight was fitted between the tubes. The destroyer was later modified to carry a single Vickers QF 3-pounder 2 in (47 mm) anti-aircraft gun and depth charges for anti-submarine warfare. The ship's complement was 72 officers and ratings.

== Construction and career ==
The 20 destroyers of the Acorn class were ordered by the Admiralty under the 1909–1910 Naval Programme on 8 September 1909. Nemesis was laid down at the Dumbarton shipyard of R. & W. Hawthorn, Leslie and Company on 26 November with yard number 434, launched on 9 August 1910 and completed in 7 March 1911. There had been a 13 week stoppage during the construction due to labour troubles. The ship was the fourth in Royal Navy service to be given the name. On commissioning, the vessel joined the Second Destroyer Flotilla.

After the British Empire declared war on Germany at the beginning of the First World War in August 1914, the Second Flotilla became part of the Grand Fleet based at Scapa Flow. On 16 October, while patrolling in the Pentland Firth, the destroyer was attacked by the German submarine U-9. The torpedo missed, crossing 200 yd (180 metres) in front of the destroyer, although the submarine escaped before Nemesis could launch a depth charge attack. On 16 March 1915, the destroyer was damaged in a collision with sister ship Nymphe during an exercise off the coast of Scotland. On 6 May, the vessel was again damaged in a collision, this time while escorting the minelayer Orvieto, but was soon back in service. Between 13 and 15 October, the Second Destroyer Flotilla escorted the battleships of the Grand Fleet in a practice cruise. The destroyer was subsequently deployed to Devonport to undertake more extensive escort duties, protecting merchant ships against German submarines, remaining there until December 1916.

At the start of 1917, Nemesis was assigned to the British Adriatic Squadron as part of the Mediterranean Fleet. The destroyer continued to act as an escort. On 26 May, the destroyer, along with sister ship Cameleon, was escorting the hospital ships Dover Castle and Karapara between Malta and Gibraltar when the flotilla was attacked by the German submarine UC-67. Dover Castle was torpedoed and sank. Protected by smoke screen sent up by Nemesis, Karapara escaped to Annaba (Bône). The submarine also escaped unharmed. Soon afterwards, the destroyer was transferred, along with sister ship Minstrel, to the Imperial Japanese Navy to serve as an escort operated by a Japanese crew. Nemesis was renamed Kanran and served with the 11th Japanese Destroyer Division with a Japanese crew, although remaining under the command of the British Admiralty. The vessel continued to successfully escort ships in the Mediterranean Sea, with shipping departing Gibraltar now forming convoys to offer greater protection. The Japanese vessels were particularly called upon to escort troop ships, a role in which they proved particularly adept.

After the Armistice, the vessel was no longer needed for Japanese service and so was returned to the Royal Navy on 17 January 1919. However, as the navy returned to a peacetime level of strength, there was no longer the need for a large number of ships and personnel and these needed to be reduced to save money. Nemesis joined 48 other destroyers in reserve at Devonport. The vessel was sold to the British Legion on 26 November 1921 to be broken up.

== Pennant numbers ==
Pennant number	Date
H72	December 1914
H88	January 1917
H73	January 1919
