= Défilé de la Victoire =

Allied victory parade

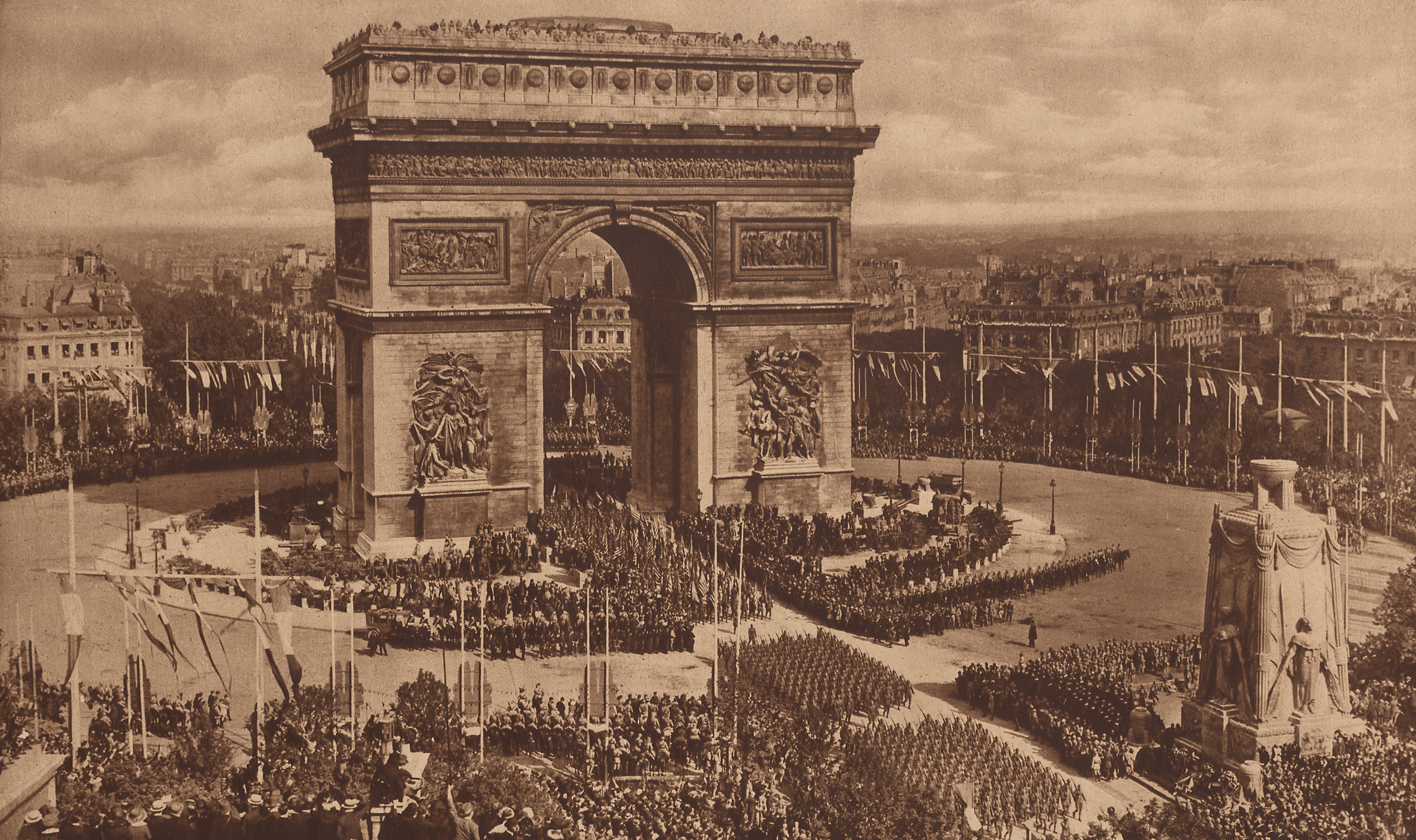
Victory Parade on 14 July 1919 at the Place de l’Étoile, Paris.

The Défilé de la Victoire (French: [defile də la viktwaʁ]; "Victory Parade") of 14 July 1919 in Paris was the first to be held after the end of the First World War, following the Armistice of 11 November 1918. The procession passed beneath the Arc de Triomphe at Place de l’Étoile (now Place Charles de Gaulle), as the Tomb of the Unknown Soldier was not installed there until the following year. The parade was organized at the initiative of Georges Clemenceau, then head of government, to commemorate the approximately 1.5 million French soldiers who had died during the war. Held on the occasion of the first Bastille Day celebrations after the conflict, the parade proceeded from Porte Maillot to Place de la République. The route followed the Avenue de la Grande Armée, passed under the Arc de Triomphe, continued along the Avenue des Champs-Élysées, crossed the Place de la Concorde, and extended through the Rue Royale and the Grands Boulevards.

At its head marched approximately one thousand wounded French soldiers, led by André Maginot, himself an amputee. They were followed by marshals Joseph Joffre, Ferdinand Foch, and Philippe Pétain on horseback, and by Allied forces marching in alphabetical order: the United States contingent led by General John J. Pershing, Belgian, British troops under Sir Douglas Haig, Greek, Indian, Italian, Japanese, Polish, Portuguese, Romanian, Serbian, Siamese, and Czechoslovak forces. French forces also participated, including units of the Army of Africa, Zouave regiments, and other formations. Renault FT tanks brought up the rear of the procession.

A gilded cenotaph, weighing approximately 30 tonnes and measuring 17.5 metres in height and 8 metres in width, created under the direction of the sculptor Antoine Sartorio, was initially installed beneath the Arc de Triomphe. It was subsequently moved to the entrance of the Champs-Élysées to allow the parade to pass under the arch. Each side of the monument featured a representation of Victory with stylized wings resembling those of an aircraft. The structure, designed as a temporary installation, was later dismantled. It consisted of a wooden framework covered with plaster panels approximately 3 centimetres thick. Nearby stood a pyramid composed of captured German cannons, surmounted by a Gallic rooster.

== Gallery ==
Victory Parade of 1919

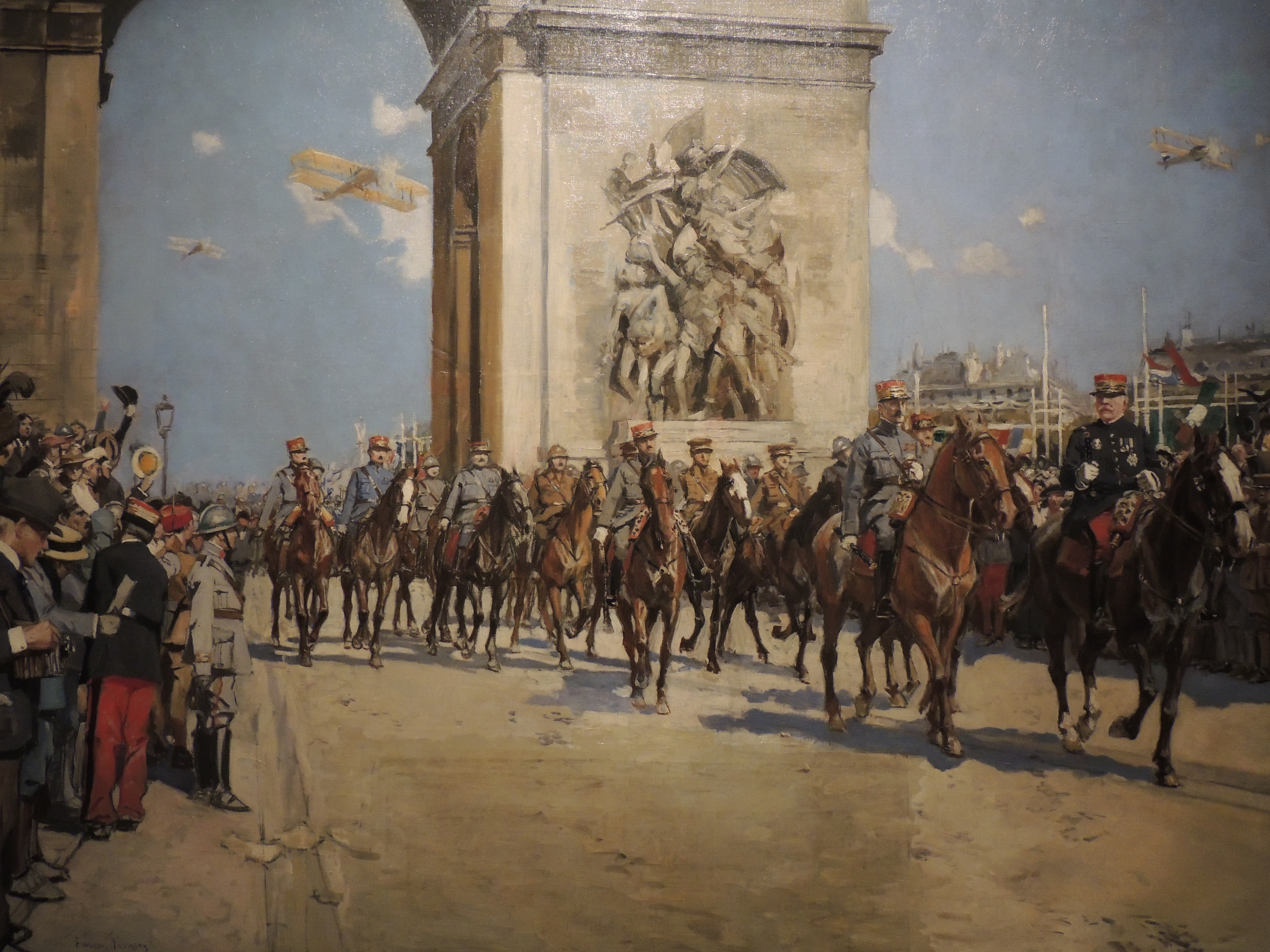
The Victory Parade in front of the Arc de Triomphe.

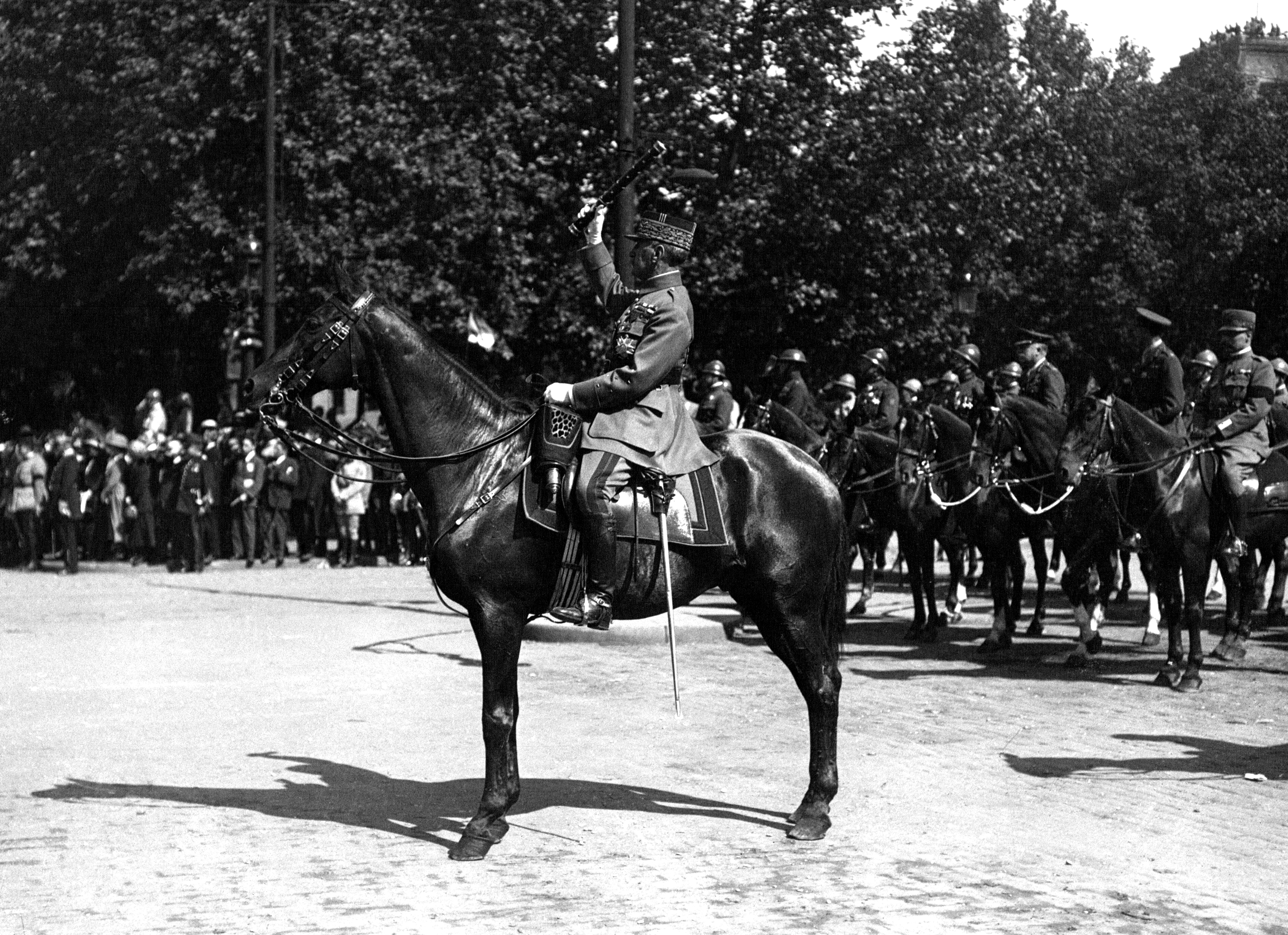
Marshal Ferdinand Foch on horseback, saluting with his baton during the Victory Parade.

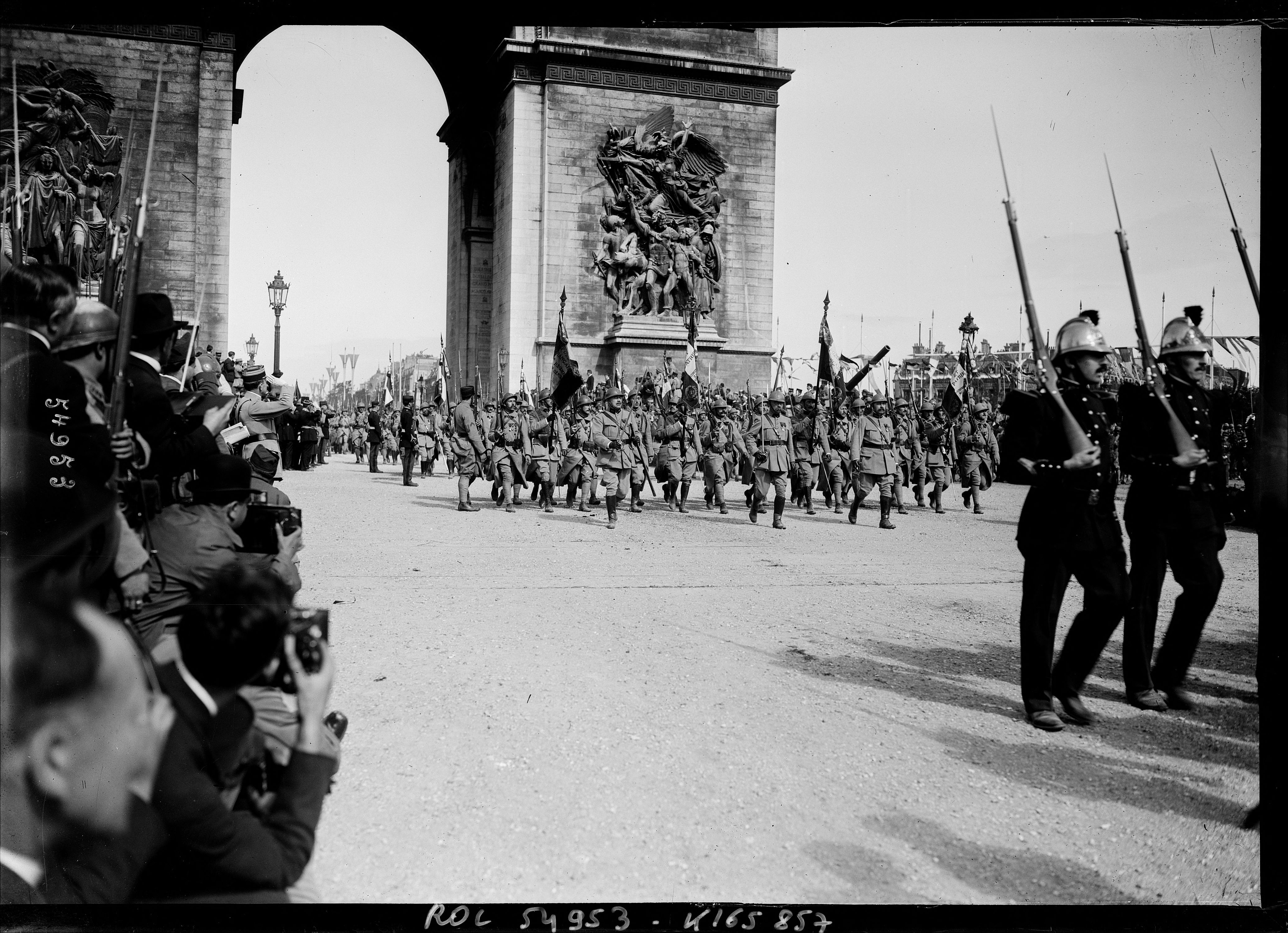
French military units during the Victory Parade in front of the Arc de Triomphe.

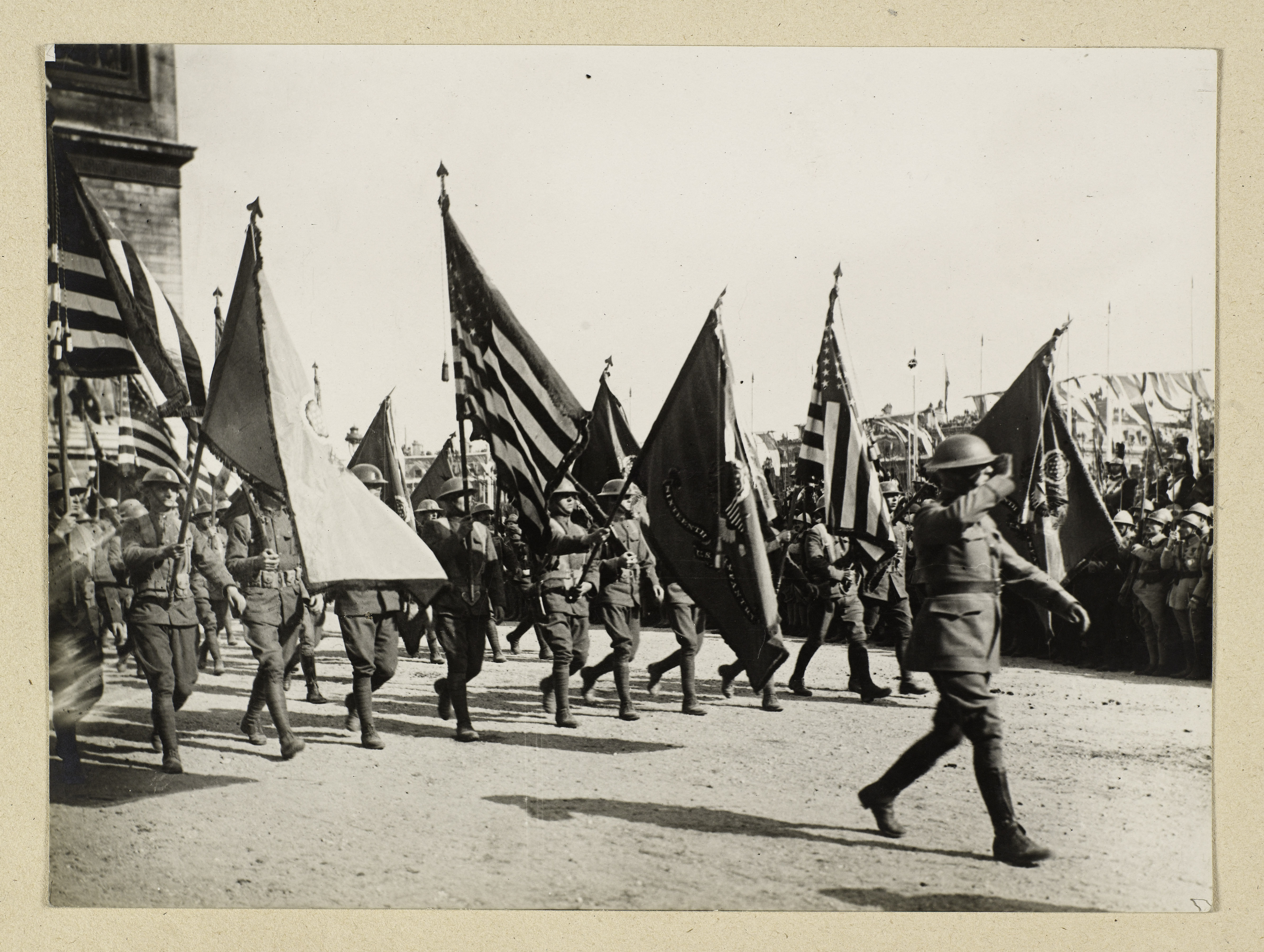
United States troops marching under the Arc de Triomphe.

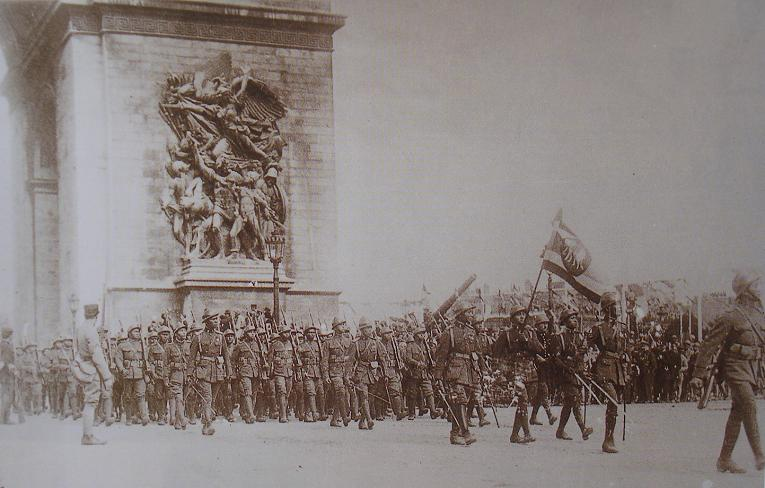
Siamese troops marching under the Arc de Triomphe.

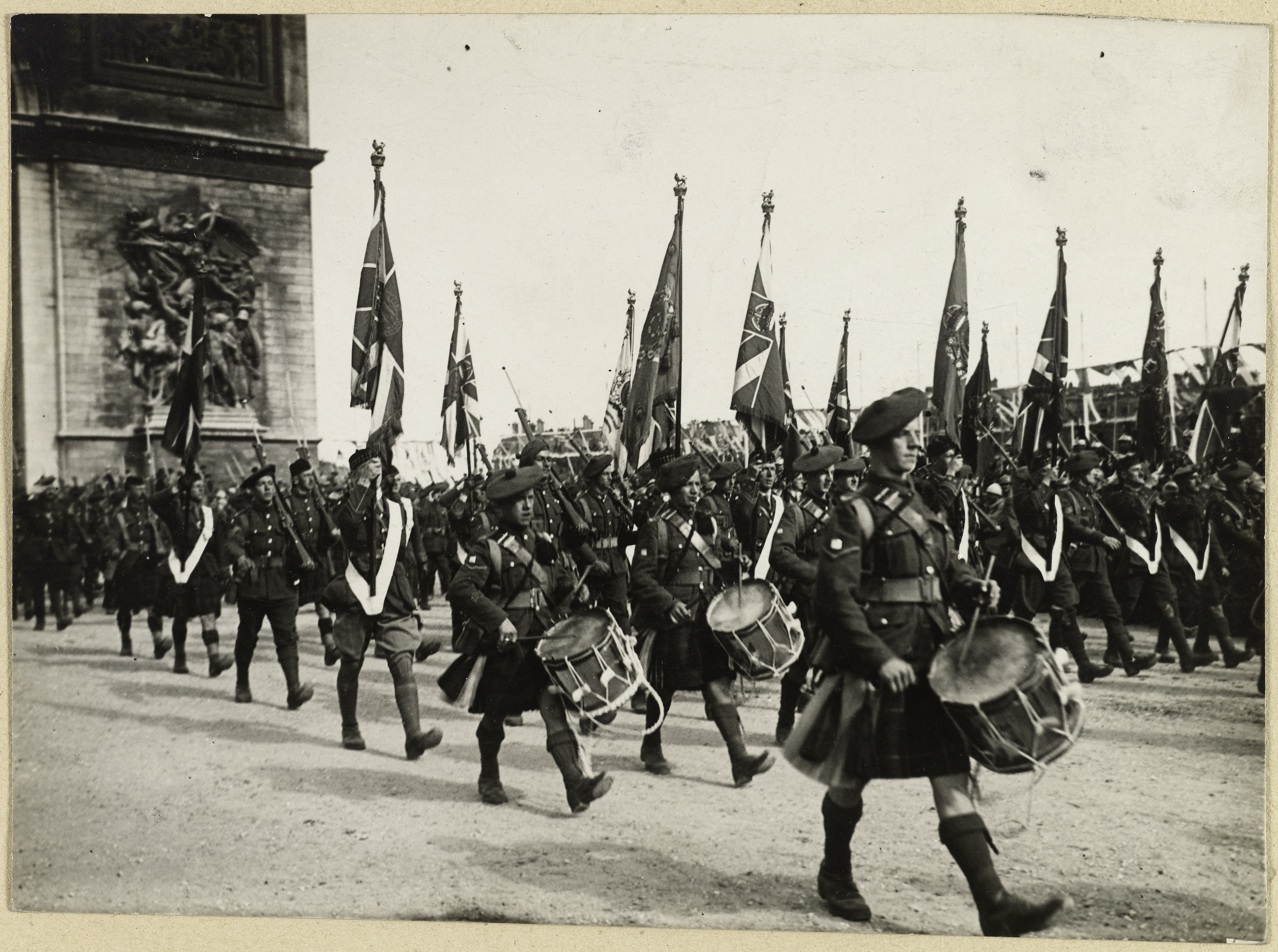
British troops marching under the Arc de Triomphe.

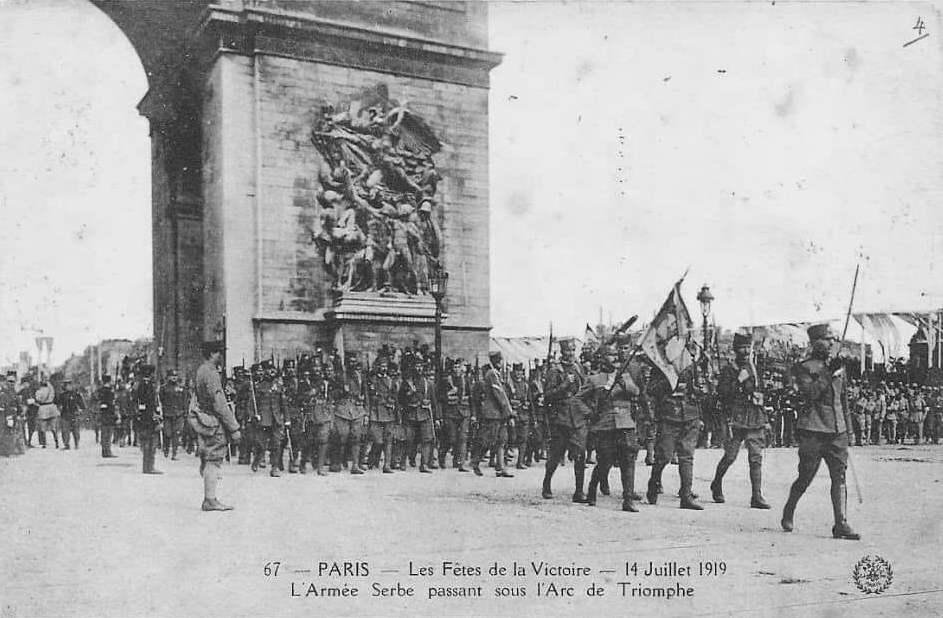
Serbian military units marching under the Arc de Triomphe.

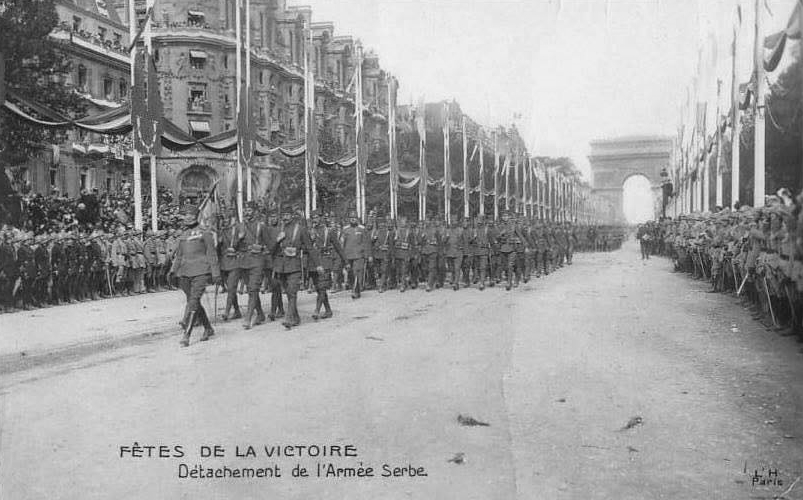
Serbian military units during the Victory Parade in front of the Arc de Triomphe.

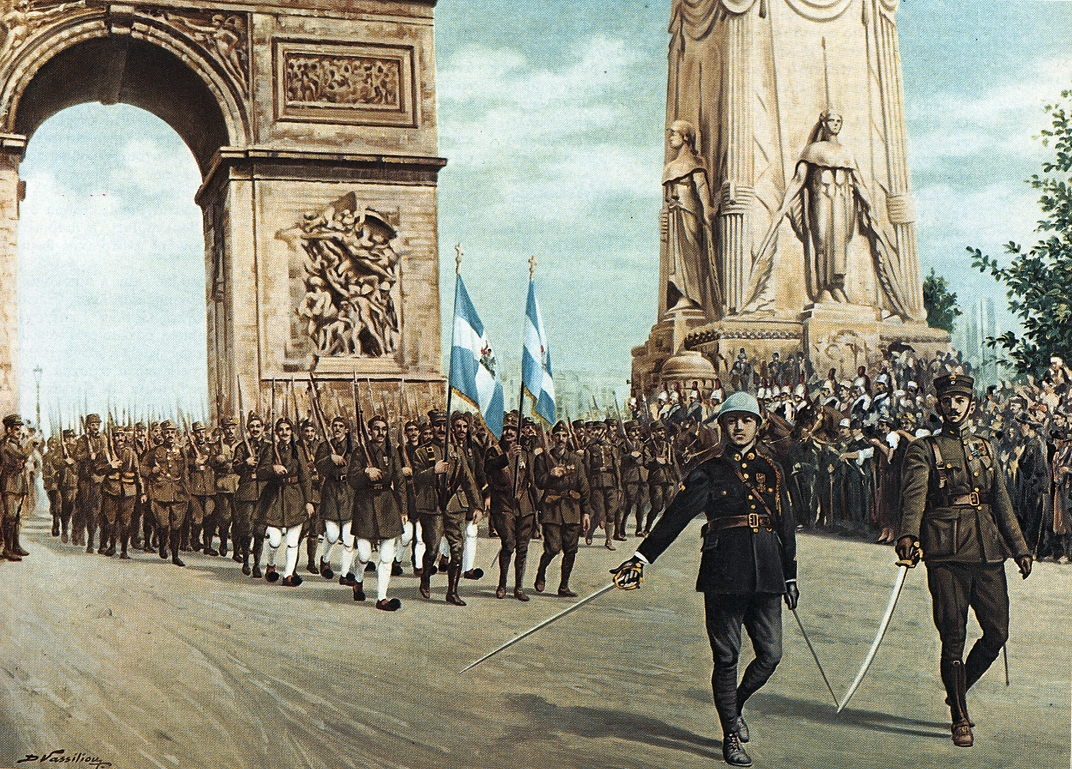
Greek military units during the Victory Parade in front of the Arc de Triomphe.

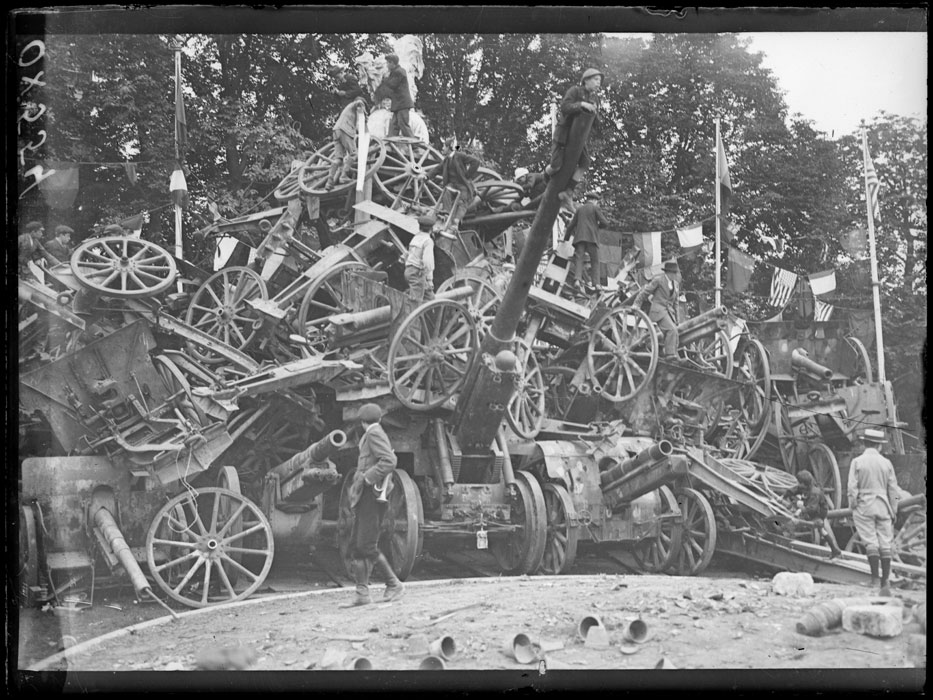
Trophy made of stacked German cannons at Place de la Concorde, Paris, for the Victory Parade.

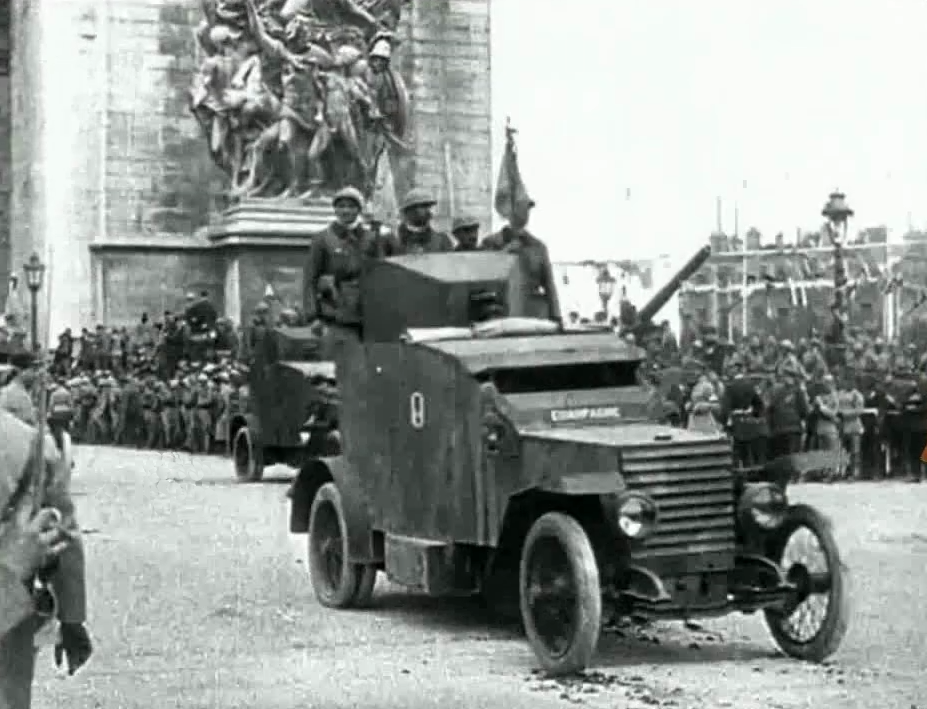
An armoured car at the Place de l’Étoile during the Victory Parade.

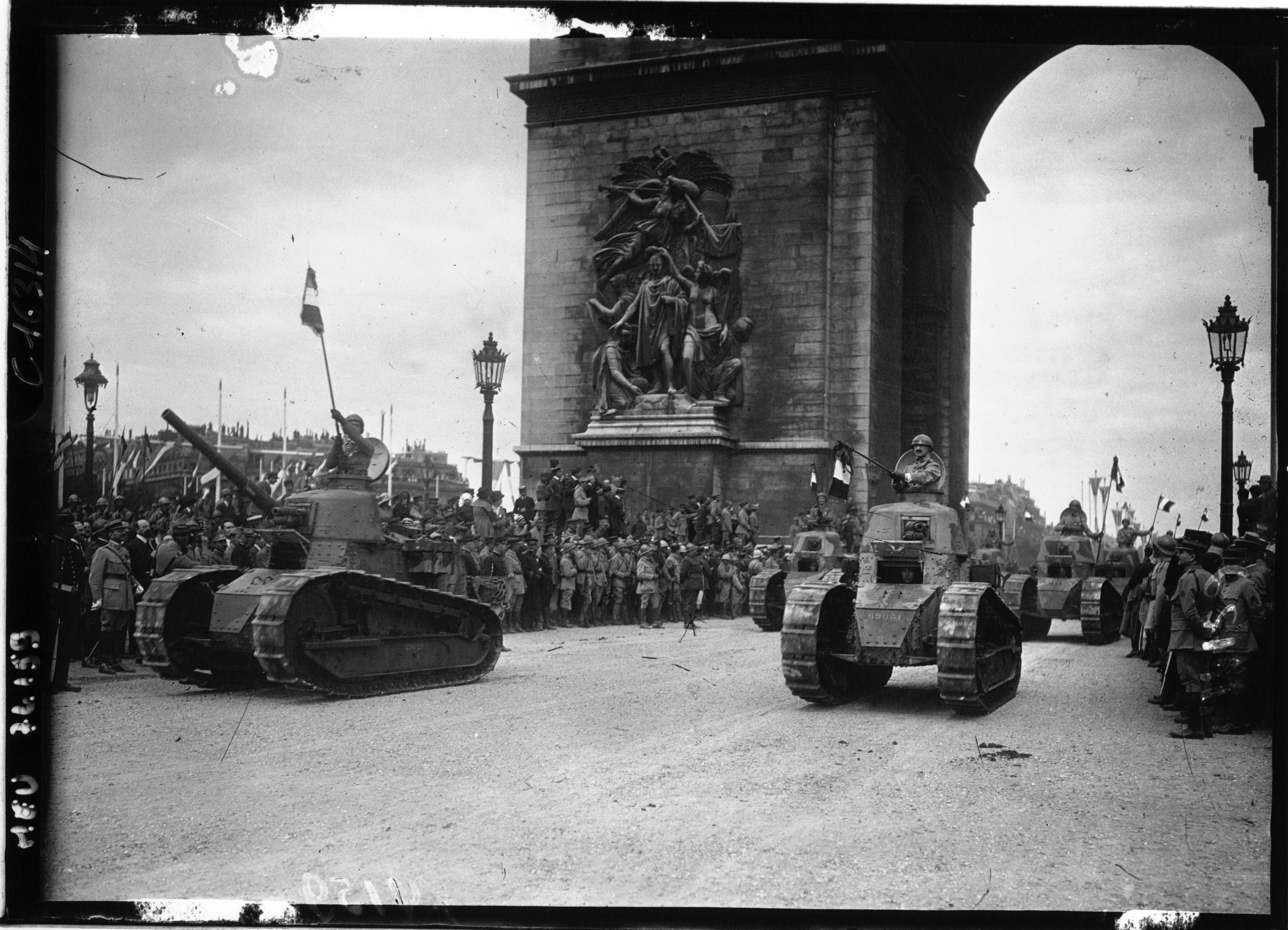
Parade of Renault FT tanks passing in front of the Arc de Triomphe.

== See also ==
- Bastille Day military parade
- Bastille Day
- Fête de la Fédération
