= SUGi =

American conservation organization

Sugi, stylized SUGi, is an American conservation organization and app that supports afforestation. Found in 2019, the platform seeks to increase biodiversity through native plant rewilding projects. Employing the Miyawaki method, SUGi has funded over 200 projects and forests in 15 countries, including in Cambridge, Massachusetts, Hong Kong, and London, United Kingdom.
