= 1st Special Squadron (Japanese Navy) =

- Active: January 1917 – October 1918
- Country: Japan
- Branch: Imperial Japanese Navy
- Type: Fleet
- Role: Protection shipping in the Pacific theatre of operations
- Part of: Admiral, Japanese Command

The 1st Special Squadron (January 1917 – October 1918) was an Imperial Japanese Navy fleet. In accordance with the Anglo-Japanese Alliance, the fleet helped defend Australia and New Zealand as well as Allied shipping in the Pacific and Indian oceans during World War I.

== Background ==
At the outbreak of war, the Royal Australian Navy (RAN) stood at 3,800 personnel and consisted of sixteen ships, including the Indefatigable-class battlecruiser Australia, the light cruisers Sydney and Melbourne, the destroyers Parramatta, Yarra and Warrego, and the submarines AE1 and AE2. Another light cruiser (Brisbane) and three destroyers were under construction, and a small fleet of auxiliary ships was also being maintained.

After the Imperial German Navy's East Asia Squadron was destroyed early in the war, most RAN ships were redeployed to the European theatres, leaving Australia and New Zealand exposed to German merchant raiders operating in the Pacific. The Australian government requested help from the British Admiralty, as the remaining warships could not effectively protect the region. These requests suggested that ships of the United States Navy be deployed to supplement the forces in Australian waters, but instead, the Admiralty contacted Japan and made arrangements for several ships to be sent to Australia.

== 1st Special Squadron ==
In January 1917, Japan created the 1st Special Squadron, made up of several cruisers supported by the 2nd Destroyer Division. They were tasked to defend the Strait of Malacca and shipping from Australia to Aden. This squadron was based at Singapore and commanded by Rear Admiral Kozaburo Oguri. To provide more coverage, the Japanese Navy formed the 3rd Special Squadron on March 26, 1917, to defend the eastern coast of Australia and New Zealand. With the capture and sinking of German raiders, the pressure against Allied shipping lessened, and after December 1917, the 3rd Special Squadron was dissolved and the operational area of the 1st Special Squadron was enlarged to include the eastern coast of Australia and New Zealand. The defence of Australia, New Zealand and of Indian shipping lanes by Japanese ships continued until October 1918.

=== Ships of the 1st Special Squadron ===
Cruisers

Name	Kanji	Image	Launched	Type
Yahagi	矢矧		October 3, 1911	Chikuma class
Tsushima	対馬		December 15, 1902	Niitaka class
Niitaka	新高		November 15, 1902	Niitaka class

2nd Destroyer Division

Name	Kanji	Image	Launched	Type
Kamikaze	神風	(Note: Picture is not of ship but a sister ship of the same class and design; see Kamikaze-class destroyer)	July 15, 1905	Kamikaze class
Kisaragi	如月		September 6, 1905	Kamikaze class
Hatsushimo	初霜	—	May 13, 1905	Kamikaze class
Hibiki	響	—	March 31, 1906	Kamikaze class

== See also ==
- North American Task Force - Fleet assigned to patrol Canada and later the West Pacific
- Third Fleet (Imperial Japanese Navy) - Fleet assigned to patrol Russian coast during the Soviet Revolution
- 2nd Special Squadron (Japanese Navy) - Fleet assigned to patrol Meditarean
- 2nd Fleet (Imperial Japanese Navy) was a fleet of the Imperial Japanese Navy (IJN) created as a mobile strike force in response to hostilities with Russia, and saw action in every IJN military operation until the end of World War II.
- 1st Fleet (Imperial Japanese Navy)

== Bibliography ==
=== References ===
- A.W. Jose. The Official History of Australia in the War of 1914–1918. Volume IX: The Royal Australian Navy (September 1987 ed.). University of Queensland Press. p. 649. ISBN 0-7022-1848-0.
- Spencer Tucker, Priscilla Mary Roberts. World War I: encyclopedia (2005 ed.). ABC-CLIO. p. 1661. ISBN 1-85109-420-2.
