= Dogger Bank (1915) order of battle =

1915 naval battle

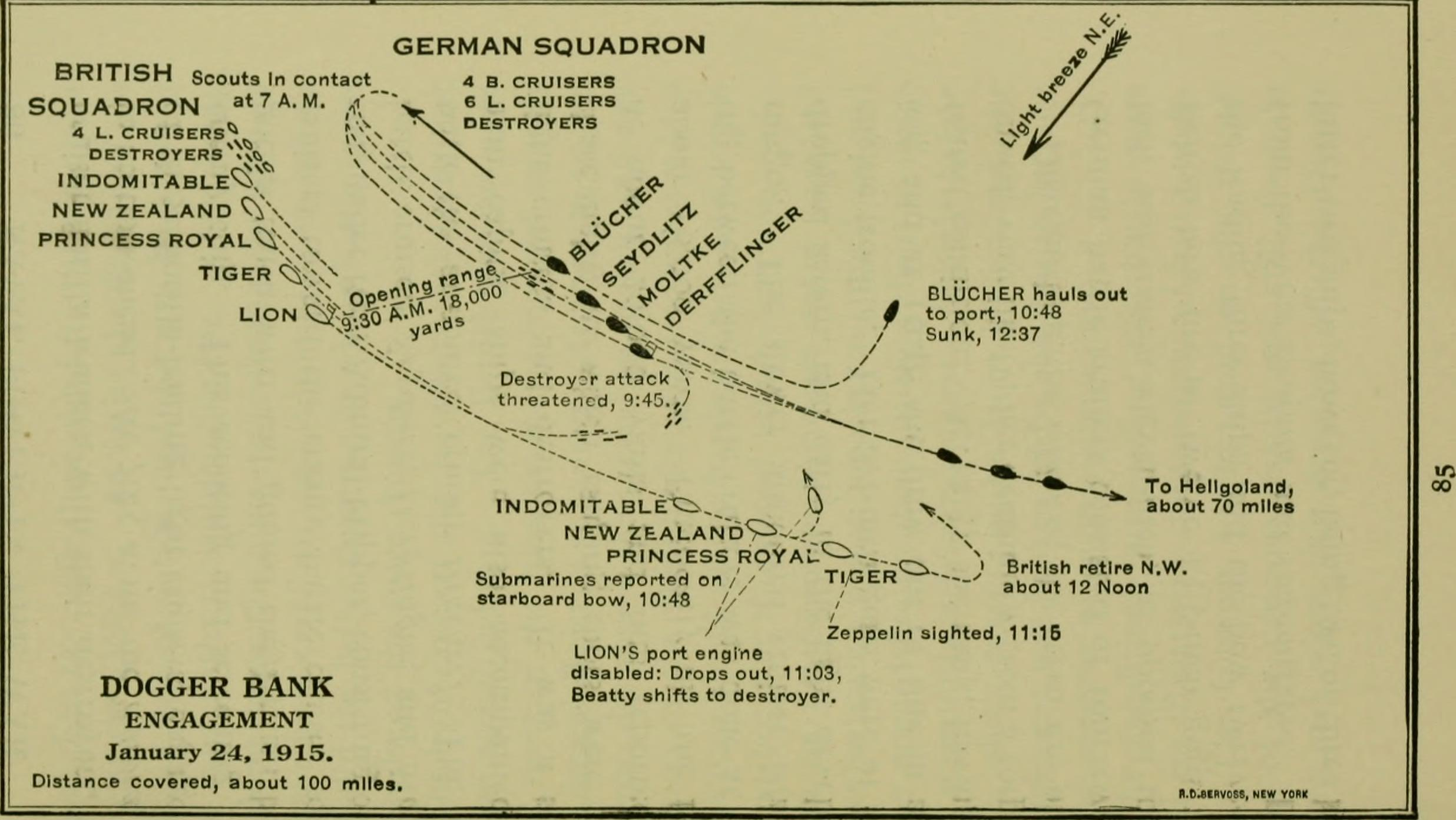
Ship movements during the Battle of Dogger Bank

The Battle of Dogger Bank was a naval engagement during the First World War that took place on 24 January 1915 near the Dogger Bank in the North Sea between squadrons of the British Grand Fleet and the Kaiserliche Marine (High Seas Fleet).

The British surprised the smaller and slower German squadron, which fled for home. During a stern chase lasting several hours, the British caught up with the Germans and engaged them with long-range gunfire. The German squadron returned to harbour, with some ships in need of extensive repairs. The Germans lost Blücher and most of her crew. The British flagship Lion was out of action for several months, but they lost no ships and suffered few casualties.

After the British victory, both navies sacked officers who were thought to have shown poor judgement and made changes to equipment and procedures because of failings observed during the battle.

== Summary ==
=== Ships present ===
	Royal Navy	Imperial German Navy
Battlecruisers	5 total 8 × 13.5-in. main-battery broadside HMS Tiger (28,500 tons, 28 kn.) 2 × Lion class (26,270 tons, 27.5 kn.) 8 × 12-in. main-battery broadside HMS New Zealand (18,500 tons, 25 kn.) HMS Indomitable (17,408 tons, 25.5 kn.)	3 total 8 × 12-in. main-battery broadside SMS Derfflinger (26,600 tons, 26.5 kn.) 10 × 11-in. main-battery broadside SMS Seydlitz (24,988 tons, 26.5 kn.) SMS Moltke (22,979 tons, 25.5 kn.)
Armored cruisers		1 total 8 × 8.3-in. main-battery broadside SMS Blücher (15,842 tons, 25.4 kn.)
Light cruisers	7 total 4 × Town class (5,400 tons, 25.5 kn.) 3 × Arethusa class (3,512 tons, 28.5 kn.)	4 total SMS Graudenz (4,834 tons, 27.5 kn.) SMS Rostock (4,800 tons, 29.3 kn.) SMS Stralsund (4,500 tons, 27.5 kn.) SMS Kolberg (4,293 tons, 25.5 kn.)
Destroyers / torpedo boats *	37	18
Submarines	4	
Totals	53	26

* The German Navy's torpedo boats were of similar size and function to the destroyers in the Royal Navy, and are often referred as such.

== Abbreviations ==
Abbreviations for Officers' Ranks

Adm / Admiral
VAdm / Vice-admiral : Vizeadmiral / VAdm
RAdm / Rear-admiral : Konteradmiral / KAdm
Cdre / Commodore : Kommodore / Kom
Capt / Captain : Kapitän zur See / KptzS
Cdr / Commander : Fregattenkapitän / FKpt
Lt Cdr / Lieutenant-commander : Korvettenkapitän / KKpt
Lt / Lieutenant : Kapitänleutnant / KptLt
SLt / Sub-lieutenant : Oberleutnant zur See / OLtzS

Other Abbreviations

AdC.: Aide de Camp to The King
C.B.: Companion of The Most Honourable Order of the Bath
C.M.G.: Companion of The Most Distinguished Order of Saint Michael and Saint George
C.V.O.: Commander of The Royal Victorian Order
D.F: Destroyer Flotilla
D.S.C.: Distinguished Service Cross
D.S.O.: Distinguished Service Order
HMS: His Majesty's Ship
SMS: Seiner Majestät Schiff (German; translation: His Majesty's Ship)
K.C.B.: Knight Commander of The Most Honourable Order of the Bath
M.V.O.: Member of The Royal Victorian Order
the Hon.: The Honourable

== Royal Navy ==
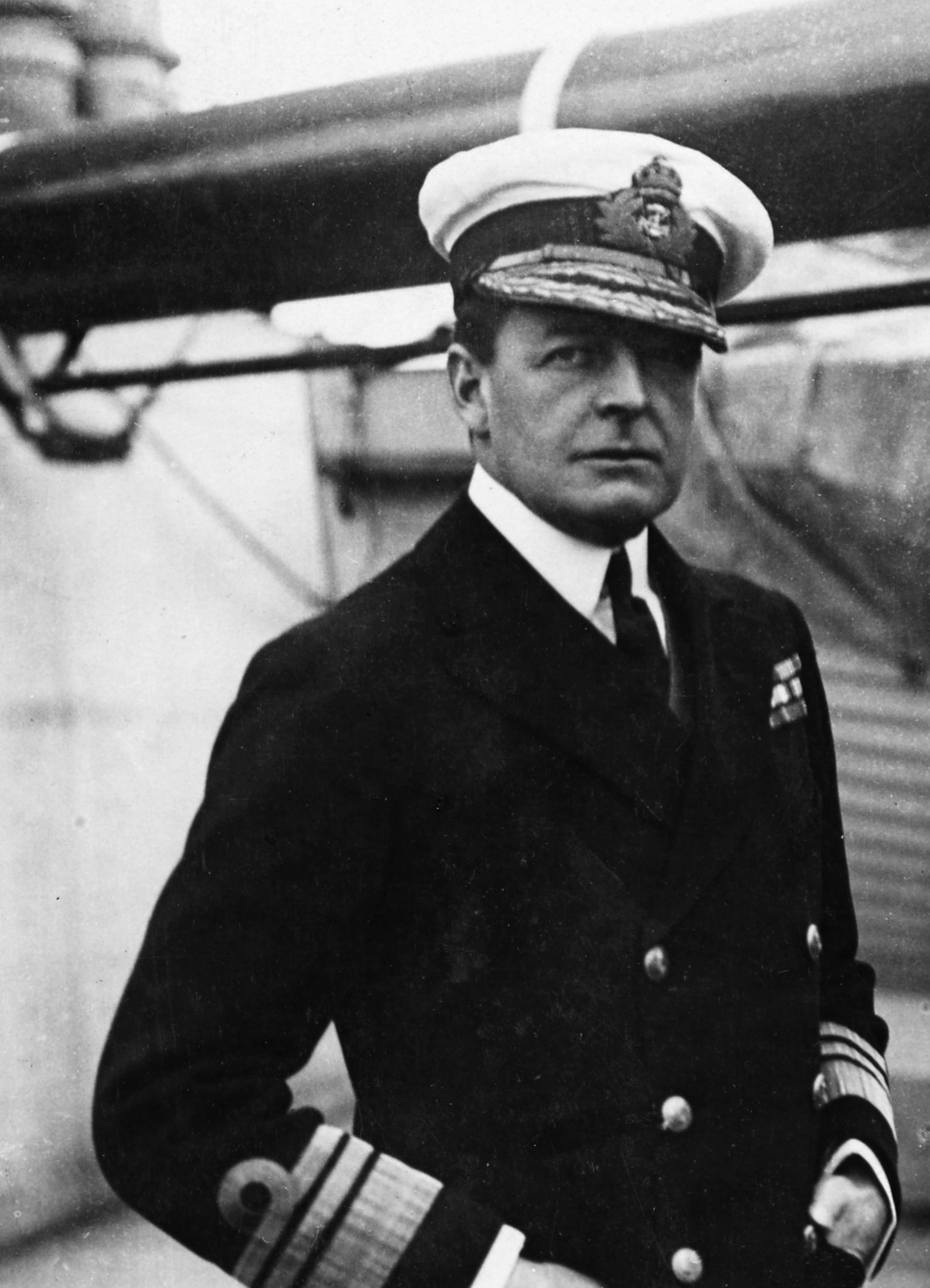
Vice-Adm. Sir David R. Beatty

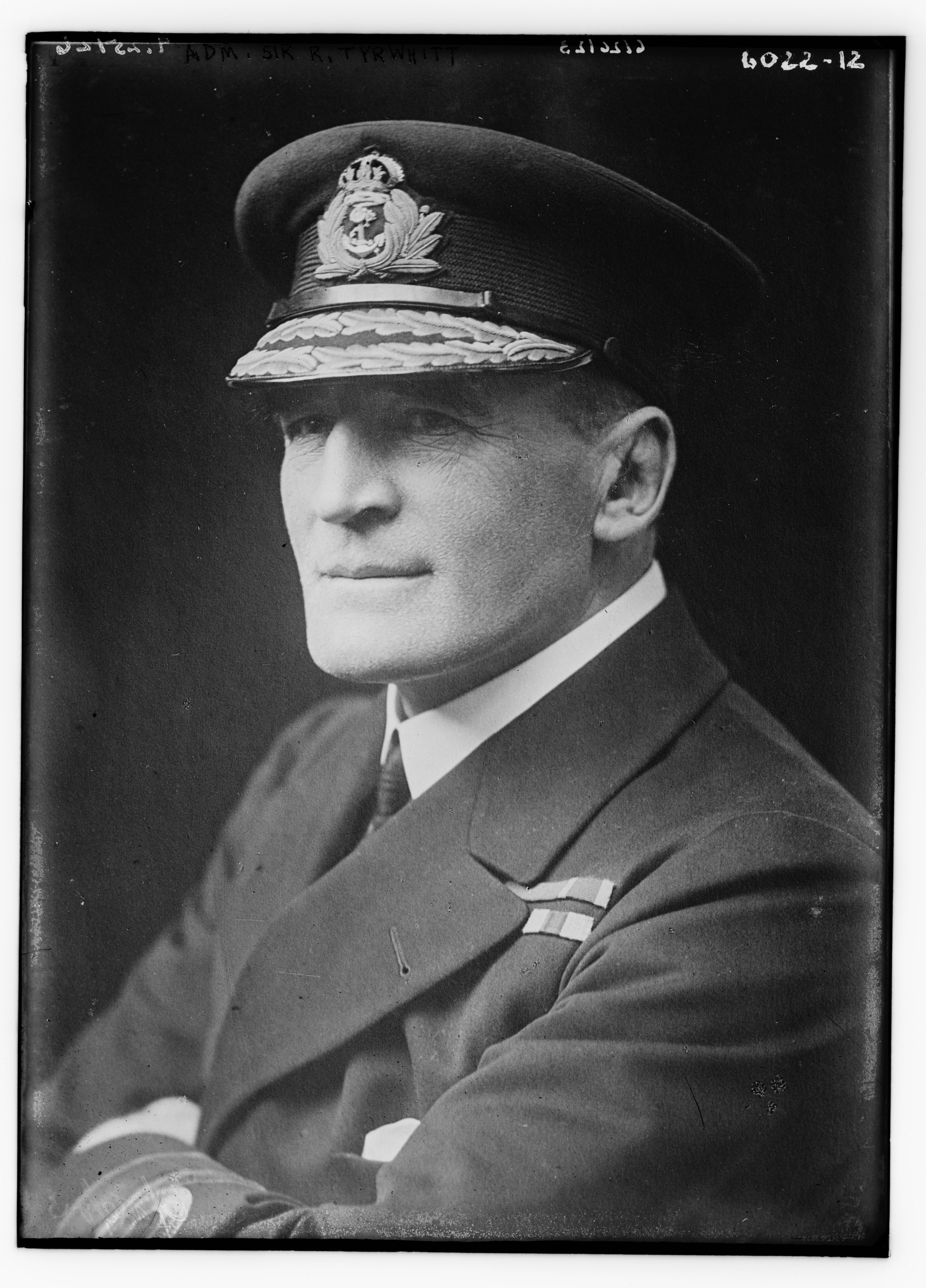
Adm. Sir Reginald Y. Tyrwhitt

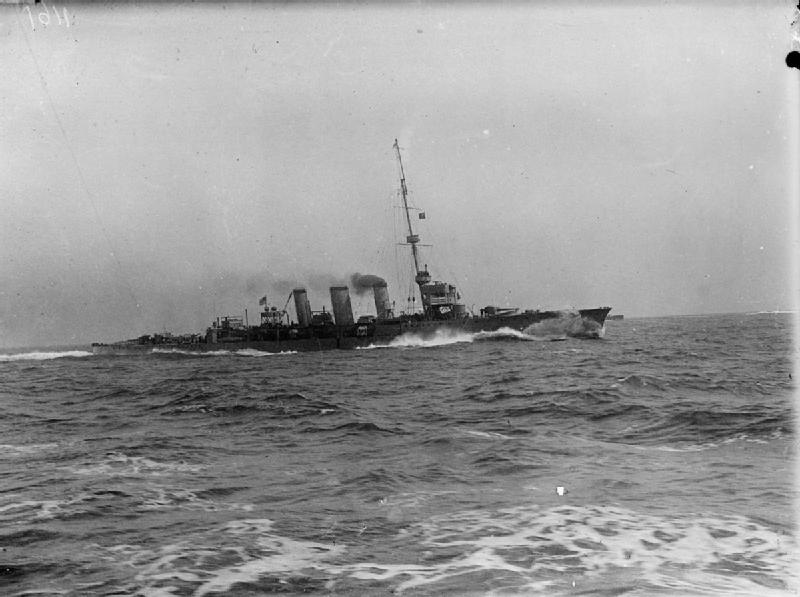
Light cruiser Arethusa underway

=== Battlecruiser Force ===
1st Battlecruiser Squadron
Vice-Admiral Sir David Beatty, K.C.B., M.V.O., D.S.O.

HMS Lion (flagship): Capt Alfred E. M. Chatfield, C.V.O.
HMS Tiger: Capt Henry Bertram Pelly, M.V.O.
HMS Princess Royal: Capt Osmond de B. Brock, A.d.C.

2nd Battlecruiser Squadron
Rear-Admiral Sir Archibald Moore, K.C.B., C.V.O.

HMS New Zealand (flagship): Capt Lionel Halsey, C.M.G., A.d.C.
HMS Indomitable: Capt Francis W. Kennedy

1st Light Cruiser Squadron
Commodore (2nd Class) William E. Goodenough, M.V.O.

HMS Southampton: Cdre Goodenough
HMS Nottingham: Capt Charles B. Miller
HMS Birmingham: Capt Arthur A. M. Duff
HMS Lowestoft: Capt Theobald W. B. Kennedy

=== Harwich Force ===
Commododre (T) Reginald Y. Tyrwhitt, C.B.

HMS Arethusa (light cruiser) Cdre Tyrwhitt

Attached Destroyers (Note: Soon to become the 10th Destroyer Flotilla)

HMS Meteor: Capt the Hon. Herbert Meade
HMS Miranda: Cdr Barry E. Domvile (Note: Miranda sailed with 3rd D.F. but joined Cdre (T) before the action.)
HMS Mentor: Cdr Rafe G. Rowley-Conwy
HMS Milne: Lt-Cdr Henry R. Clifton Mogg
HMS Mastiff: Lt-Cdr James L. Forbes
HMS Minos: Lt-Cdr Ernest H. B. Williams
HMS Morris: Cdr Reginald Henniker-Heaton

1st Destroyer Flotilla
Captain Wilmot S. Nicholson

HMS Aurora (flotilla cruiser, Capt Nicholson)
1st Division/1st D.F.

HMS Acheron: Cdr Brien M. Money
HMS Attack: Lt-Cdr Cyril Callaghan
HMS Hydra: Lt-Cdr Robert S. Buchanan
HMS Ariel: Lt-Cdr James V. Creagh

3rd Division/1st D.F.

HMS Ferret: Cdr Geoffrey Mackworth
HMS Forester: Lt-Cdr Montague G. B. Legge
HMS Defender: Lt-Cdr Cecil H. H. Sams
HMS Druid: Lt-Cdr Roger V. Allison

4th Division/1st D.F.

HMS Hornet: Cdr Cecil G. Chichester
HMS Tigress: Lt-Cdr Paul Whitfield
HMS Sandfly: Lt-Cdr Francis G. C. Coates
HMS Jackal: Lt-Cdr John C. Tovey

5th Division/1st D.F.

HMS Goshawk: Cdr Dashwood F. Moir
HMS Phoenix: Lt-Cdr Michael K. H. Kennedy
HMS Lapwing: Lt-Cdr Alexander H. Gye

3rd Destroyer Flotilla
Captain Francis G. St. John, M.V.O.

HMS Undaunted (flotilla cruiser, Capt St.John)
1st Division/3rd D.F.

HMS Lookout: Cdr Arthur B. S. Dutton
HMS Lysander: Lt-Cdr George W. Taylor
HMS Landrail: Lt-Cdr Bruce Lloyd Owen

2nd Division/3rd D.F.

HMS Laurel: Cdr George P. England
HMS Liberty: Lt-Cdr Reginald B. C. Hutchinson D.S.C.
HMS Laertes: Cdr Malcolm L. Goldsmith
HMS Lucifer: Lt-Cdr Ralph M. Mack

3rd Division/3rd D.F.

HMS Laforey: Cdr Graham R. L. Edwards
HMS Lawford: Lt-Cdr Arthur A. Scott
HMS Lydiard: Lt-Cdr George H. Knowles
HMS Louis: Lt-Cdr Richard W. U. Bayly

4th Division/3rd D.F.

HMS Legion: Lt-Cdr Claud F. Allsup
HMS Lark: Lt-Cdr Charles E. Hughes-White

8th Submarine Flotilla
Commododre (S) Roger Keyes

Destroyers

HMS Firedrake: Lt-Cdr Alfred B. Watts
HMS Lurcher: Cdr Wilfred Tomkinson

Deployed submarines

HMS E4: Lt-Cdr E. W. Leir
HMS E7: Lt-Cdr F. Fielmann
HMS E8: Lt-Cdr F. H. H. Goodhart
HMS E11: Lt-Cdr M. E. Nasmith

== Imperial German Navy ==
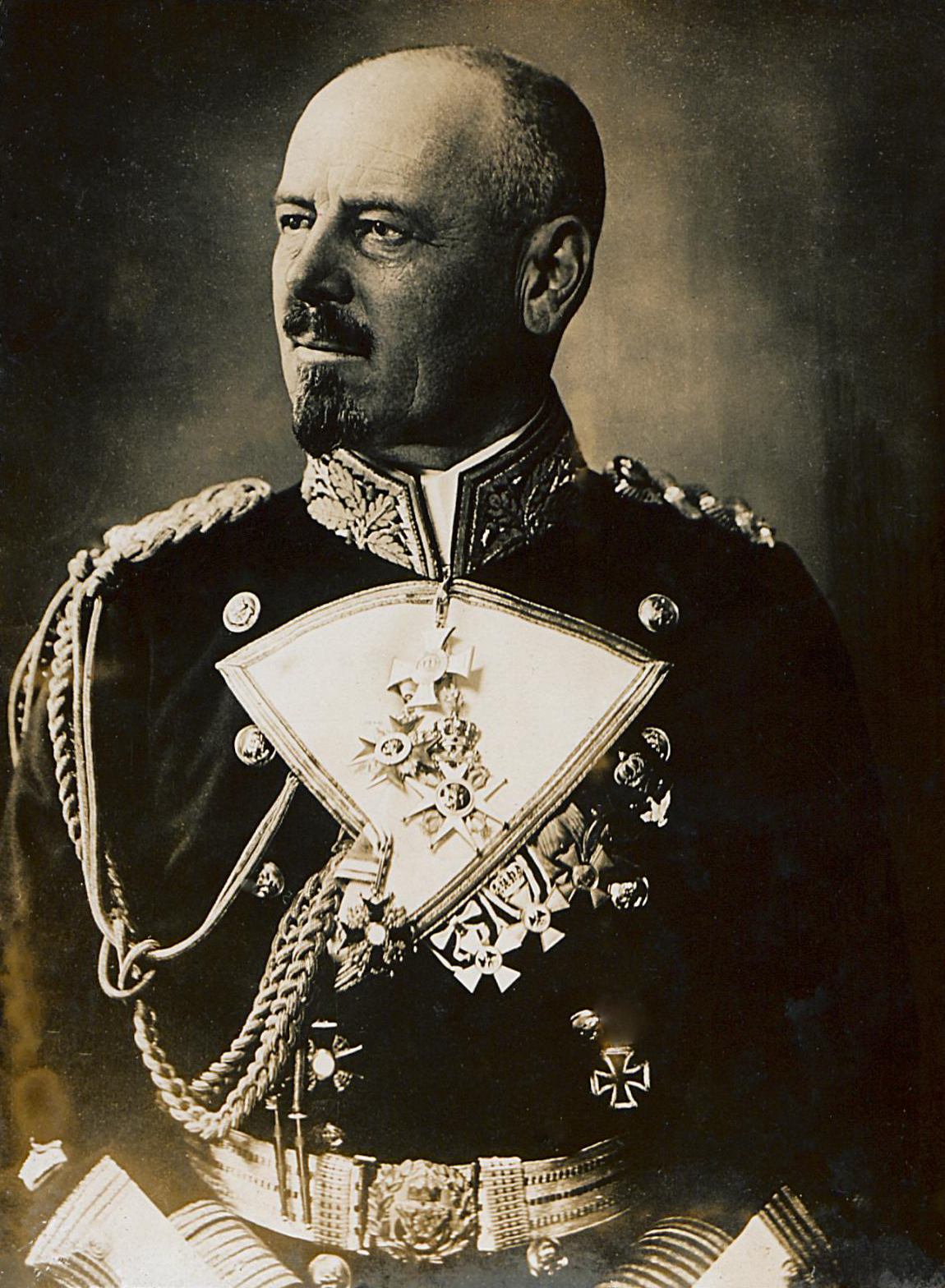
Kadm Franz Hipper

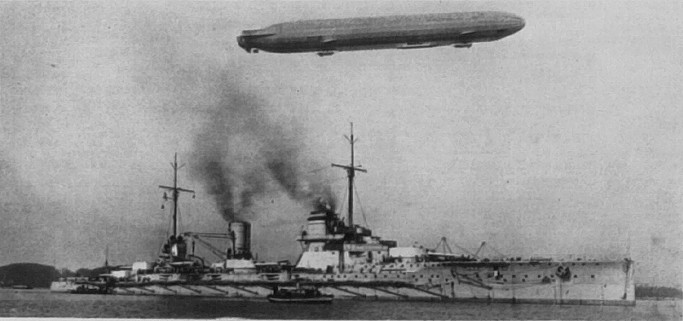
Battle cruiser Seydlitz, KAdm Hipper's flagship, with zeppelin.

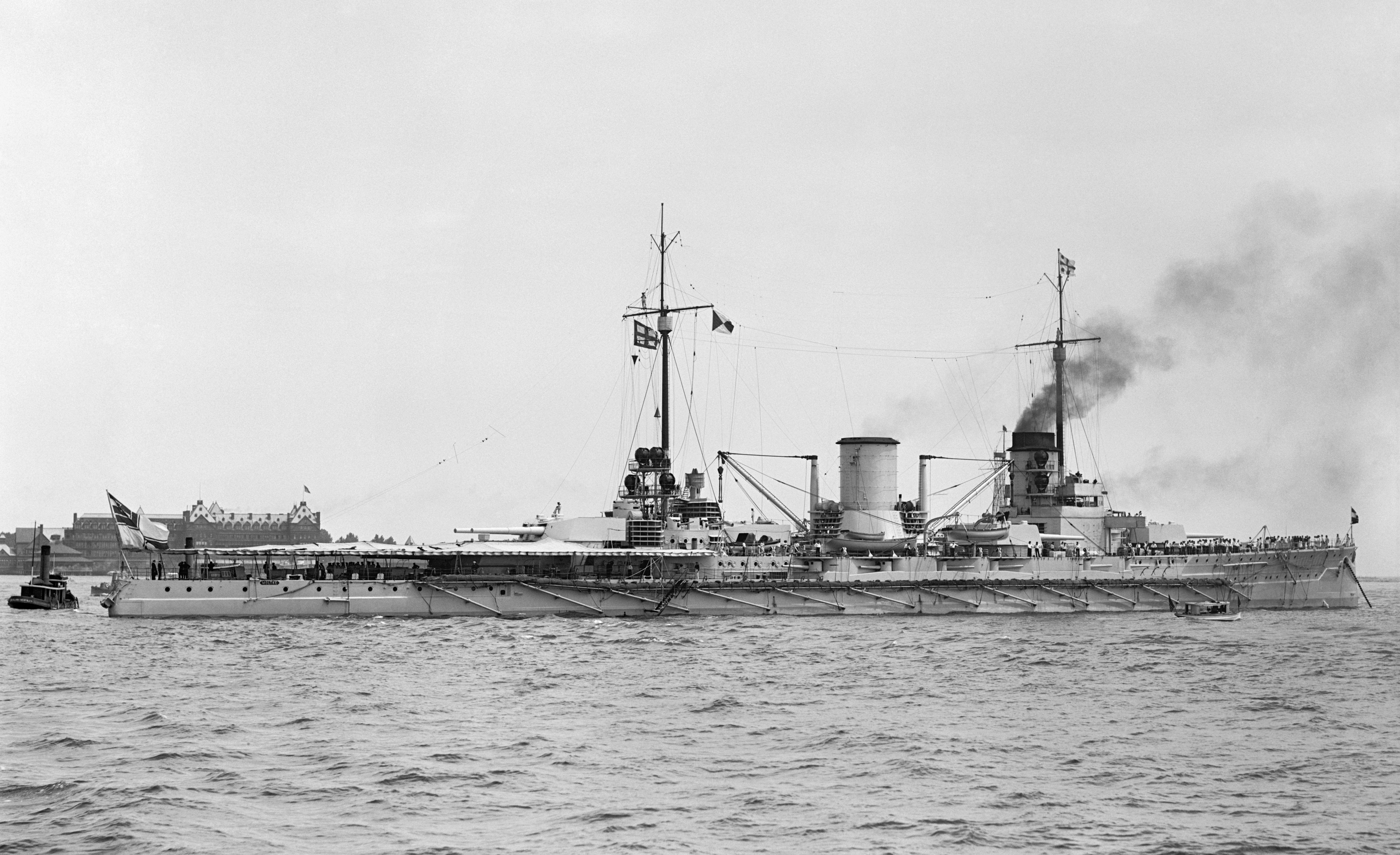
Battle cruiser Moltke at Hampton Roads

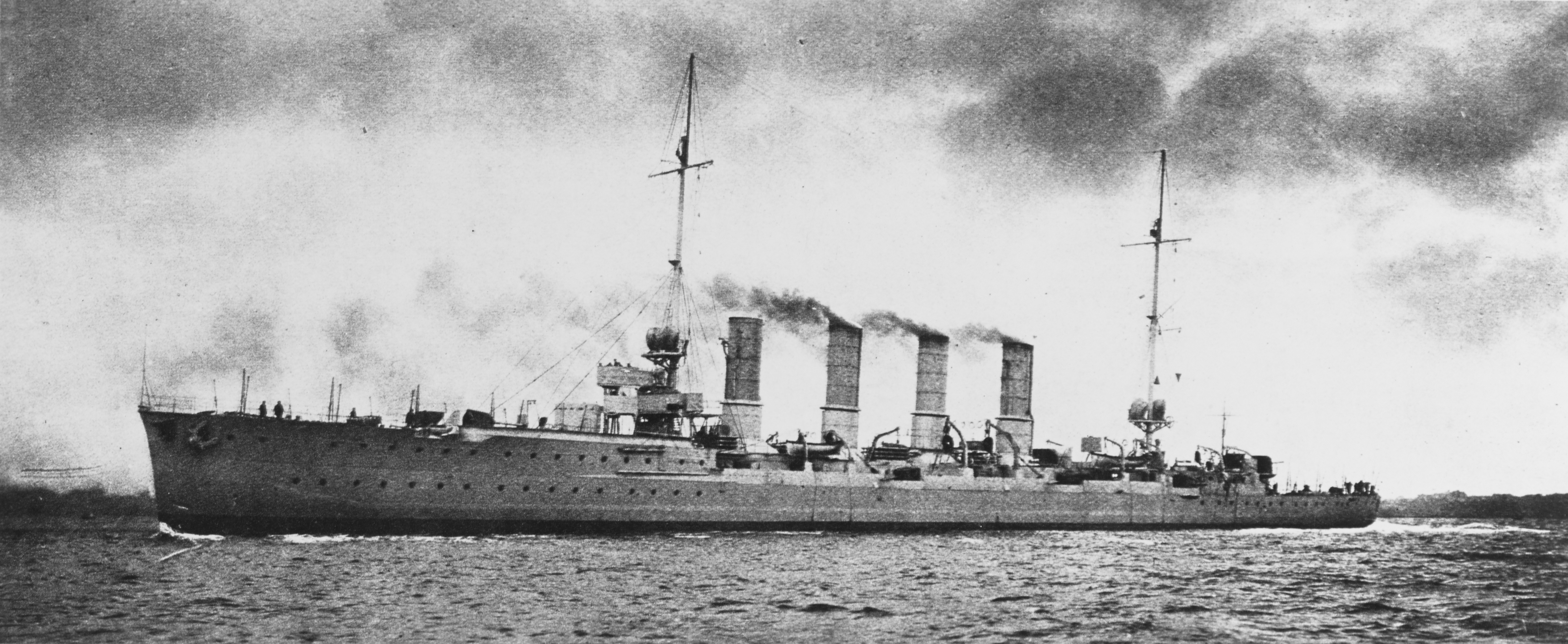
Light cruiser Rostock

1st Scouting Group (I. Aufklärungsgruppe) (battlecruisers)
Konteradmiral Franz von Hipper

SMS Seydlitz (flagship): Kapt.z.S. Moritz von Egidy ^{(GE)}
SMS Moltke: Kapt.z.S. Magnus von Levetzow^{(GE)}
SMS Derfflinger: Kapt.z.S. Ludwig von Reuter
SMS Blücher (sunk): F.Kapt. Alexander Erdmann

2nd Scouting Group (II. Aufklärungsgruppe) (light cruisers)
Konteradmiral Georg Hebbinghaus

SMS Graudenz (flagship): F.Kapt. Theodor Püllen ^{(GE)}
SMS Stralsund: F.Kapt. Viktor Harder
SMS Rostock: Kapt.z.S. Johannes Hartog
SMS Kolberg: F.Kapt. Wilhelm Widenmann^{(GE)}

5th Torpedo-Boat Flotilla (V. Torpedoboots Flottille)
K.Kapt. Bernd von dem Knesebeck

SMS G12: Kptlt. Hans Loening

9th Half-Flotilla (9. halbflottille)

SMS V1: Kptlt. Walter Hoffert
SMS V4: Kptlt. Kurt Heeseler
SMS V5: Kptlt. Wolf von Eichhorn

10th Half-Flotilla (10. halbflottille)

SMS G11: K.Kapt. Oskar Heinecke
SMS G9: Kptlt. Hans Anschütz
SMS G7: Kptlt. Johannes Weineck
SMS G8: Kptlt. Adolf Müller
SMS V2: Kptlt. Gerhard Hoefer

8th Torpedo-Boat Flotilla (VIII. Torpedoboots Flottille)

SMS S178: K.Kapt. Paul Hundertmarck

15th Half-Flotilla (15. halbflottille)

SMS V181: K.Kapt. Georg Weißenborn
SMS V182: Kptlt. Hans Hufnagel
SMS V185: Kptlt. Carl August Claussen^{(GE)}

18th Half-Flotilla (18. halbflottille)

SMS V30: K.Kapt. Werner Tillessen ^{(GE)}
SMS S33: Oblt.z.S. Hartmut Buddecke
SMS S34: Kptlt. Otto Andersen
SMS V29: Kptlt. Erich Steinbrinck
SMS S35:

== Sources ==
=== British ===
- Beatty, David (2 March 1915). "Action in the North Sea on Sunday, the 24th of January, 1915". The London Gazette (29088). London. ISSN 0374-3721.
- Corbett, J. S. (1929) [1921]. Naval Operations. History of the Great War based on Official Documents. Vol. II (2nd ed.). London: Longmans, Green. OCLC 220474040.
- Home Waters: From November 1914 to the End of January 1915 (PDF). Naval Staff Monographs. Vol. III. Appendix C. The Naval Staff, Training and Staff Duties Division. 1921. OCLC 220734221.
- The Navy List for January 1915. London: HMSO. 1915. OCLC 59612658.

=== German ===
- Groos, Otto (1925). Der Krieg in der Nordsee: Von Ende November bis Anfang Februar 1915 [The War in the North Sea: From the End of November until the Beginning of February, 1915]. Der Krieg zur See, 1914–18. Vol. III. Berlin: Verlag von E. S. Mittler & Sohn. OCLC 260121080.
- Stoelzel, Albert (1930). Ehrenrangliste der Kaiserlich-Deutschen Marine 1914–18 [Honor Rank List of the Imperial German Navy 1914–18]. Berlin: Marine-Offizier-Verband. OCLC 62432982.
