= HMS Hind (1911) =

Acheron-class destroyer of the Royal Navy from 1911

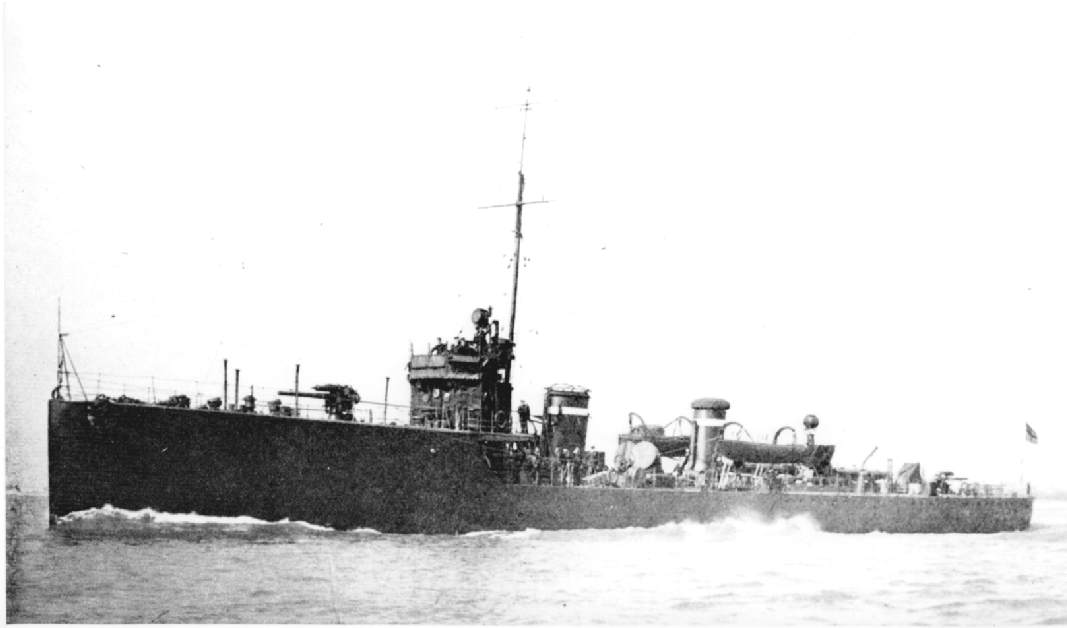
- HMS Hind

History

United Kingdom
- Name: HMS Hind
- Builder: John Brown & Company of Clydebank
- Yard number: 404
- Laid down: 13 February 1911
- Launched: 28 July 1911
- Fate: Sold 9 May 1921

General characteristics
- Class & type: Acheron-class destroyer
- Displacement: 990 tons
- Length: 75 m (246 ft)
- Beam: 7.8 m (26 ft)
- Draught: 2.7 m (8.9 ft)
- Installed power: 13,500 shp (10,100 kW)
- Propulsion: Two Brown-Curtis Turbines; Two Yarrow boilers (oil fired); Two shafts
- Speed: 28 knots (52 km/h)
- Complement: 72
- Armament: 2 × BL 4-inch (101.6 mm) L/40 Mark VIII guns, mounting P Mark V; 2 × QF 12 pounder 12 cwt naval gun, mounting P Mark I; 2 × single tubes for 21 inch (533 mm) torpedoes

HMS Hind was an Acheron-class destroyer of the Royal Navy that served during World War I and was sold for breaking in 1921. She was the seventeenth Royal Navy ship to be named after the female deer.

== Construction ==
She was built under the 1910-11 shipbuilding programme by John Brown & Company of Clydebank, Glasgow. She (and her sisters Hornet and Hydra) differed from the standard Admiralty I-class destroyer in only having two shafts instead of three. They had two Brown-Curtis type turbines, and twin boilers. Capable of 28 knots, she carried two 4-inch guns, other smaller guns and two 21 inch (533 mm) torpedo tubes and had a complement of 72 men. She was launched on 28 July 1911.

== Pennant Numbers ==
Pennant Number	From	To
H47	6 December 1914	1 January 1918
H40	1 January 1918	Early 1919
H60	Early 1919	9 May 1921

== Career ==
=== Pre-War ===
Hind served with the First Destroyer Flotilla from 1911 and, with her flotilla, joined the British Grand Fleet in 1914 on the outbreak of World War I.

=== The Battle of Heligoland Bight ===
She was present with First Destroyer Flotilla on 28 August 1914 at the Battle of Heligoland Bight, led by the light cruiser Fearless, and shared in the prize money for the battle.

=== Transfer to Third Battle Squadron ===
Hind was not present with her flotilla at the Battle of Jutland on 31 May 1916. She was one of seven destroyers to go with the First Destroyer Flotilla when it was transferred from the Grand Fleet to screen the Third Battle Squadron in November 1916.

=== Mediterranean Service ===
In 1917 the Third Battle Squadron was sent to the Mediterranean, where they took part in the 1918 Naval campaign in the Adriatic, including enforcing the Otranto Barrage. Hind was present at the entry of the Allied Fleet through the Dardanelles on 12 November 1918.

== Disposal ==
In common with most of her class, she was laid up after World War I, and on 9 May 1921 she was sold to Thos. W. Ward for breaking. She was eventually scrapped in Preston in 1924.
