= James Tancred =

Royal Navy officer during the First World War

Vice-Admiral James Tancred
- Born: 17 September 1864
- Died: 9 September 1943 (aged 78)
- Burial place: St Margaret and St Andrew Churchyard, Exmouth, Devon
- Military career
- Allegiance: United Kingdom
- Branch: Royal Navy
- Service years: 1878–1931
- Rank: Vice-Admiral
- Commands: HMS Argyll
- Conflicts: First World War

Vice-Admiral James Charles Tancred (17 September 1864 – 9 September 1943), born James Charles Cleghorn, was a British officer of the Royal Navy. He saw service in the First World War, and rose to the rank of vice-admiral.

== Early life and family ==
James Charles Cleghorn was born on 17 September 1864, the second son of Captain George Cleghorn, JP DL, of the 17th Lancers, and his wife, Mary Anne Hay Lumsden, daughter of Colonel Thomas Lumsden CB, of Belhelvie Lodge, Aberdeenshire. His father was born with the surname Cleghorn, but changed it to Tancred by Royal Licence in 1885.

He married, in 1901, Cecile Margaret Scott, daughter of Walter Scott of Wauchope, and had a daughter: Katherine Mary Antonitta Tancred (1902–1984). His wife died in 1955, aged 75.

== Naval career ==
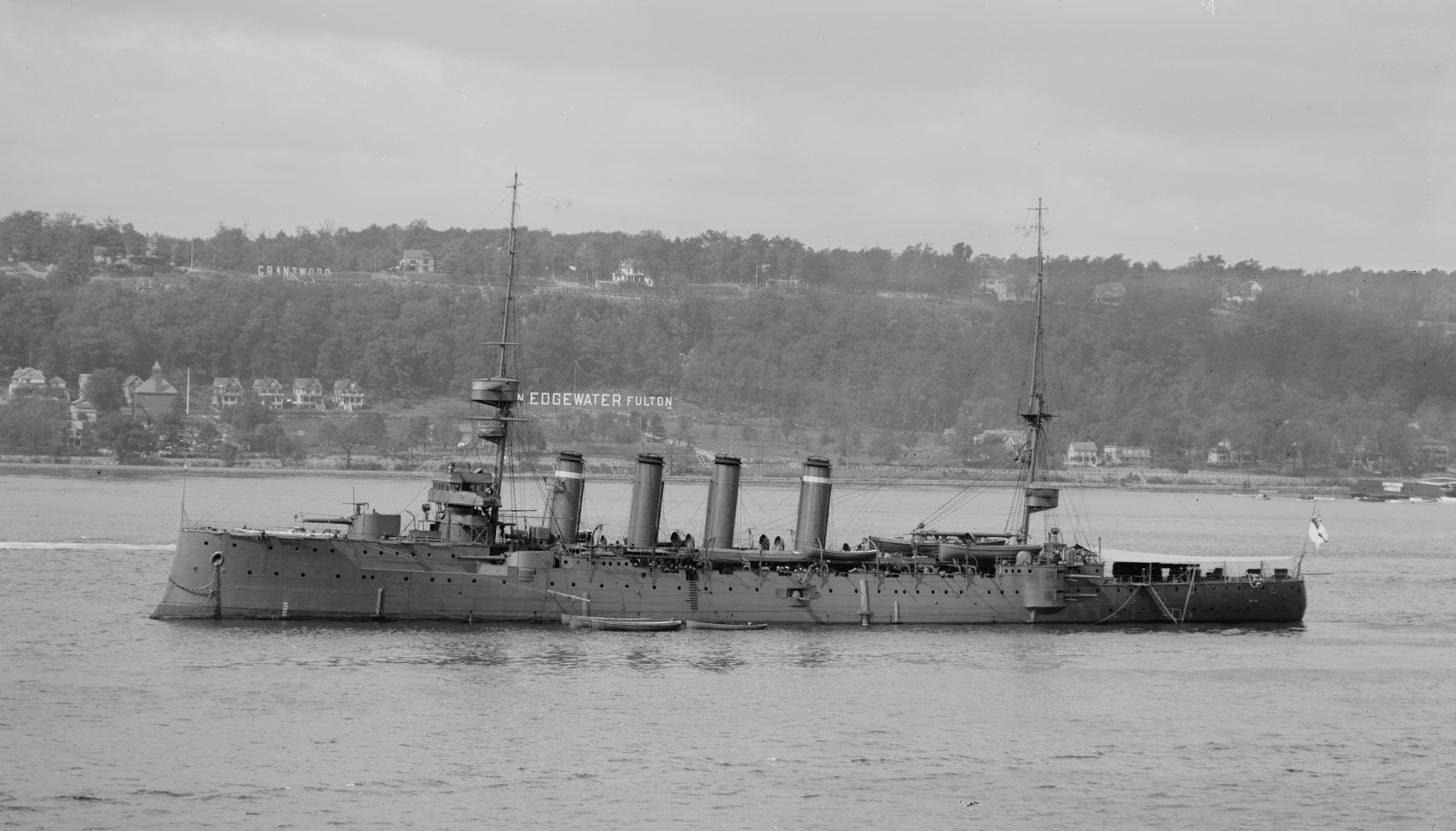
HMS Argyll in 1909.

Cleghorn entered the Royal Navy on 15 January 1878. He was promoted to commander in 1901, and in January 1903 was posted to the Vivid for Devonport Dockyard Reserve. He was promoted to captain in 1908, rear-admiral in 1919 and vice-admiral in 1925. He was included on the retired list by 1931.

Captain Tancred was in command of HMS Argyll when she ran aground by Bell Rock Lighthouse, off the coast of Angus, Scotland, in 1915; the ship was wrecked, but the crew was rescued without loss.

== Later life ==
He died on 9 December 1943 and was buried in St Margaret and St Andrew Churchyard, Exmouth, Devon. He left an estate worth over £1,100.
