= Acheron-class destroyer =

1911–1912 British Royal Navy ships

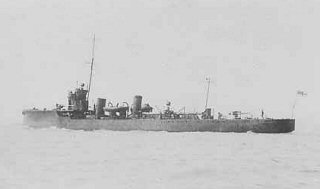
- HMS Acheron

Class overview
- Name: Acheron-class destroyer
- Builders: Cammell Laird; J. I. Thornycroft; J. Samuel White; John Brown and Company; R. W. Hawthorn Leslie & Company; Swan Hunter & Wigham Richardson; Vickers Ltd; William Beardmore & Co; William Denny & Brothers; Yarrow & Co.
- Operators: Royal Navy
- Preceded by: Acorn class
- Succeeded by: Acasta class
- Built: 1911–1912
- In commission: 1911–1922
- Completed: 23
- Lost: 3

General characteristics
- Displacement: 750 to 790 tons
- Length: 246 ft (75.0 m) to 252 ft (76.8 m)
- Beam: 26 ft (7.9 m) to 26 ft 9 in (8.15 m)
- Draught: 8 ft 6 in (2.59 m) to 9 ft (2.7 m)
- Installed power: Standard I-class: 13,500 shp (10,067 kW); Acheron, Ariel: 15,500 shp (11,558 kW); Lurcher, Oak, Firedrake: 20,000 shp (14,914 kW)
- Propulsion: Standard I-class: 3 × Parsons steam turbines; 3 × Yarrow-type oil-fired boilers; 3 × shafts; Ferret, Forester: 3 × Parsons steam turbines; 3 × White-Forster oil-fired boilers; 3 × shafts; Hind, Hornet, Hydra: 2 × Brown-Curtis turbines; 2 × Yarrow-type oil-fired boilers; 2 × Shafts; Oak, Lurcher, Firedrake: 2 × Parsons turbines; 3 × Yarrow oil-fired boilers; 2 × shafts
- Speed: 27 kn (50 km/h; 31 mph) – 35 kn (64.8 km/h; 40.3 mph)
- Armament: 2 × BL 4-inch (101.6 mm) L/40 Mark VIII guns, mounting P Mark V; 2 × QF 12-pounder (76 mm) 12 cwt guns, mounting P Mark I; 2 × single tubes for 21-inch (530 mm) torpedoes

The Acheron class (renamed the I class in October 1913) was a class of twenty-three destroyers of the British Royal Navy, all built under the 1910–11 Programme and completed between 1911 and 1912, which served during the First World War. There was considerable variation between the design and construction of ships within this class, which should be considered as more of a post-build grouping than a homogeneous class. (Note: No class of ships were called J class.)

== Design ==
Originally, 20 ships, including Acheron, were ordered but three more were completed by Yarrow & Company. The Acherons were generally repeats of the preceding Acorn- or H-class, although Acheron and five others were builders' specials. They differed from the Acorns in having only two funnels, both of which were short, the foremost being thicker than the after stack. The 12-pounder guns were mounted slightly further forward than in the Acorns.

== Variation within the class ==
Fourteen of the class were completed to an Admiralty standard design, although those built by John Brown and Company at Clydebank (Hind, Hornet and Hydra) had Brown-Curtis type turbines and only two shafts. Archer and Attack used steam at higher pressures and Badger and Beaver were completed with geared steam turbines for evaluation purposes, achieving speeds of 30.7 kn (56.9 km/h; 35.3 mph) in trials.

=== Thornycroft specials ===
Acheron and Ariel were longer (253 ft (77 m)), had higher power (15,500 shp) and were faster, achieving 29.4 kn (54.4 km/h; 33.8 mph) in trials.

=== Yarrow specials (or "special I class") ===
Sir Alfred Yarrow maintained that it was possible to build strong, seaworthy destroyers with a speed of 32 kn (59 km/h; 37 mph), and eventually a contract for three such boats was placed with the firm. They were a little larger than the rest of the class and developed 20,000 shp (15,000 kW), but carried the same armament. Like the John Brown-built boats Hind, Hydra and Hornet, they had only 2 shafts, with steam developed in 2 Yarrow-type water-tube boilers and delivered to 2 Parsons turbines. Firedrake, Lurcher and Oak were distinctive in appearance and indeed much faster. They all exceeded their contract speed, Lurcher making over 35 kn (65 km/h; 40 mph).

== Conversion to minelayers ==
Ferret, Sandfly and Ariel were converted into fast minelaying destroyers in 1917, serving with the 20th Flotilla. They were each capable of laying 40 mines.

== Evaluation ==
This class of torpedo boat destroyers (TBDs, or colloquially, "boats") handled well and were excellent sea boats; like similar classes of TBDs of the time, they had open bridges but were much drier at sea than was the norm.

== Ships ==
=== Builders' I class ===
Name	Ship Builder	Launched	Fate
Acheron	John I. Thornycroft & Company, Woolston	27 June 1911	Sold 9 May 1921
Archer	Yarrow & Company, Scotstoun, Glasgow	21 October 1911	Sold 9 May 1921
Ariel	John I. Thornycroft & Company, Woolston	26 September 1911	Converted to fast minelayer in 1917. Mined while minelaying in North Sea 2 August 1918
Attack	Yarrow & Company, Scotstoun, Glasgow	12 December 1911	Torpedoed or mined by German U-boat UC-34 off Alexandria 30 December 1917.
Badger	William Denny & Brothers, Dumbarton	11 July 1911	Sold 9 May 1921
Beaver	William Denny & Brothers, Dumbarton	6 October 1911	Sold May 1921

=== Admiralty I class ===
Name	Ship Builder	Launched	Fate
Defender	William Denny & Brothers, Dumbarton	30 August 1911	Sold 4 November 1921
Druid	William Denny & Brothers, Dumbarton	4 December 1911	Sold 9 May 1921
Ferret	J. Samuel White & Company, Cowes	12 April 1911	Converted to fast minelayer in 1917. Sold May 1921
Forester	J. Samuel White & Company, Cowes	1 June 1911	Sold November 1921
Goshawk	William Beardmore & Company, Dalmuir	18 October 1911	Sold November 1921
Hind	John Brown & Company, Clydebank	28 July 1911	Sold 9 May 1921
Hornet	John Brown & Company, Clydebank	20 December 1911	Sold 9 May 1921
Hydra	John Brown & Company, Clydebank	19 February 1912	Sold 9 May 1921
Jackal	R. W. Hawthorn Leslie & Company, Hebburn	9 September 1911	Sold September 1920
Lapwing	Cammell Laird & Company, Birkenhead	29 July 1911	Sold October 1921
Lizard	Cammell Laird & Company, Birkenhead	10 October 1911	Sold 4 November 1921
Phoenix	Vickers, Barrow-in-Furness	9 October 1911	Torpedoed by the Austro-Hungarian submarine U-27 in the Adriatic Sea on 14 May 1918
Sandfly	Swan Hunter & Wigham Richardson, Wallsend	26 July 1911	Converted to fast minelayer in 1917. Sold May 1921
Tigress	R. W. Hawthorn Leslie & Company, Hebburn	20 December 1911	Sold 9 May 1921

=== Yarrow Specials (or "Special I class") ===
Name	Ship Builder	Launched	Fate
Firedrake	Yarrow & Company, Scotstoun, Glasgow	9 April 1912	Sold 10 October 1922
Lurcher	Yarrow & Company, Scotstoun, Glasgow	1 June 1912	Sold 9 June 1922
Oak	Yarrow & Company, Scotstoun, Glasgow	5 September 1912	Sold May 1921

== Bibliography ==
- Destroyers of the Royal Navy, 1893–1981, Maurice Cocker, 1983, Ian Allan ISBN 0-7110-1075-7
- The British Destroyer by Captain T D Manning CBE VRD RNVR (Ret'd), (Putnam, 1961)
- Conway's All the World's Fighting Ships 1906–1921, Conway Maritime Press, 1985, Robert Gardiner ISBN 0-85177-245-5
