= HMS Mastiff (1914) =

Thornycroft M-class destroyer of the Royal Navy

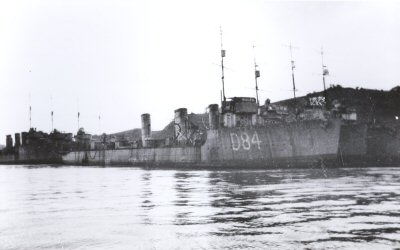
- Sister ship Meteor laid up in 1920

History

United Kingdom
- Name: HMS Mastiff
- Builder: Thornycroft & Company, Southampton
- Laid down: 24 July 1913
- Launched: 5 September 1914
- Completed: November 1914
- Out of service: 9 May 1921
- Fate: Sold to be broken up

General characteristics
- Class & type: Thornycroft M-class destroyer
- Displacement: 985 long tons (1,001 t) (normal)
- Length: 274 ft 4 in (83.62 m) o/a
- Beam: 27 ft 4.5 in (8.344 m)
- Draught: 10 ft 9.5 in (3.289 m)
- Installed power: 4 Yarrow boilers, 26,500 shp (19,800 kW)
- Propulsion: Parsons steam turbines, 2 shafts
- Speed: 35 kn (65 km/h)
- Range: 1,540 nmi (2,850 km; 1,770 mi) at 15 kn (28 km/h; 17 mph)
- Complement: 78
- Armament: 3 × QF 4-inch (101.6 mm) Mark IV guns, mounting P Mk.IX; 1 × single QF 2-pounder "pom-pom" Mk.II; 2 × twin 21 inch (533 mm) torpedo tubes

HMS Mastiff was a destroyer of the M class that served with the Royal Navy during First World War. Launched by Thornycroft in 1914, the vessel was the one of two similar ships ordered as part of the 1913–14 construction programme to a Thornycroft design. The vessel was faster than other members of the class, achieving 37.5 knots (69.5 km/h; 43.2 mph) during sea trials, and gained a reputation as the fastest ship in service. Forming part of the Harwich Force, the destroyer participated in the Battle of Dogger Bank in 1915 and the First Ostend Raid in 1918, as well as other sorties against German submarines and destroyers. The vessel received no hits in any of these operations. Following the Armistice of 1918 that ended the war, Mastiff was initially allocated to the Firth of Forth Local Defence Flotilla, but was soon retired and, in 1921, sold to be broken up.

== Design and development ==
Mastiff was one of a pair of destroyers ordered from Thornycroft & Company as part of the 1913–14 construction programme for the Royal Navy. The two ships, Mastiff and Meteor, were to a modified design tendered by Thornycroft which was more powerful and faster than the standard Admiralty design. (Note: As well as the two Thornycroft ships, "specials" were also ordered from Hawthorn Leslie (two ships) and Yarrow (three ships), with six ships to the standard Admiralty design.) The M class was an improved version of the earlier L class, required to reach a higher speed in order to counter rumoured new German fast destroyers. It transpired that the German warships did not exist. In order to speed construction, initial payments were made prior to the formal order being placed.

Mastiff had a length overall of 274 feet 4 inches (83.62 m) and a length of 265 feet (81 m) between perpendiculars, with a beam of 27 feet 4.5 inches (8.344 m) and a draught of 10 feet 9.5 inches (3.29 m). Displacement was 985 long tons (1,001 t) (normal and 1,112 long tons (1,130 t) deep load. Four Yarrow three-drum boilers fed two sets of Parsons steam turbines rated at 26,500 shaft horsepower (19,800 kW) that drove two shafts. The vessel had a design speed of 35 knots (65 km/h; 40 mph). During sea trials, Mastiff achieved a speed of 37.5 knots (69.5 km/h; 43.2 mph). Up to 202 long tons (205 t) tons of oil could be carried, giving an endurance of 1,540 nautical miles (2,850 km; 1,770 mi) at 15 knots (28 km/h; 17 mph). The vessel had a complement of 78 officers and ratings.

Armament consisted of three QF 4-inch (102 mm) Mk IV guns mounted on the ships centreline, with one on the forecastle, one aft and one between the second and third funnels. Four 21 in (533 mm) torpedoes were carried in two twin rotating mounts. Two single 1-pounder 37 mm (1.5 in) "pom-pom" anti-aircraft guns were carried. Subsequently, the anti-aircraft guns were replaced by 2-pdr 40 mm (1.6 in) "pom-pom" guns. The destroyer was also later fitted with racks and storage for depth charges. Initially, only two depth charges were carried but the number increased in service and by 1918, the vessel was carrying between 30 and 50 charges.

== Construction and career ==
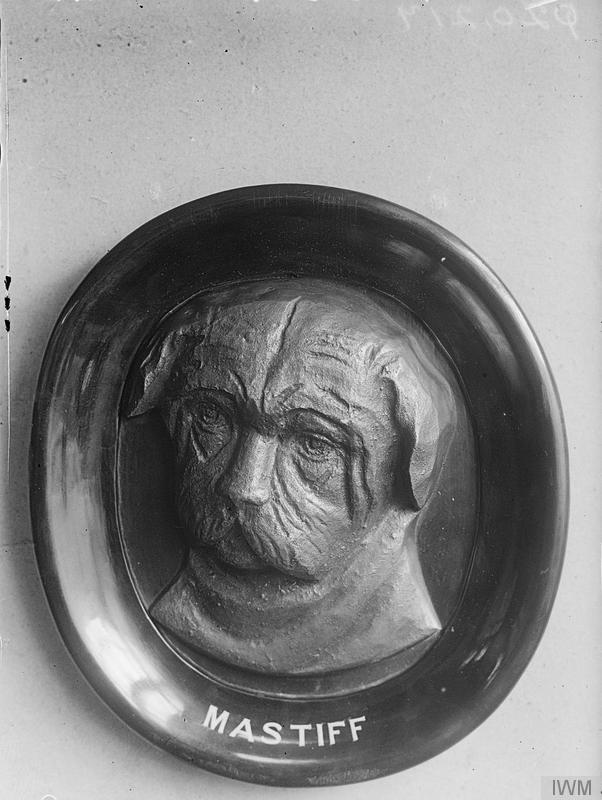
Ship's badge in the collections of the Imperial War Museum

Mastiff was laid down at Thornycroft's Southampton shipyard on 24 July 1913, launched on 5 September 1914 and completed in November at a contract price of £124,585. The ship joined the Tenth Destroyer Flotilla. The flotilla formed part of the new Harwich Force.

Mastiff was reputed to be the fastest ship in service in 1915. On 24 January, the vessel, commanded by Lt Cdr James L. Forbes, formed part of the order of battle at the Battle of Dogger Bank. The Tenth Destroyer Flotilla, led by the light cruiser Arethusa, formed the vanguard for the British Grand Fleet. The M-class were the only British destroyers that were able to stay ahead of the battlecruisers and so were able to attack the German fleet. Mastiff reported a hit on the German armoured cruiser Blücher, although this was not confirmed. Mastiff received no hits from the enemy. Blücher was sunk, the remainder of the German fleet escaping with little damage.

On 24 March, the destroyer formed part of an escort for a seaplane attack on Højer, although no bombs were dropped. Four days later, the destroyer was one of ten destroyers that searched for a German submarine, before being recalled by a false report that German battlecruisers were sailing nearby. Another search on 31 March also proved fruitless. On 22 July 1916, the destroyer sailed as part of a division of four M-class destroyers to intercept a flotilla of German destroyers. The ships failed to meet.

On 22 April 1918, the British launched attacks against Zeebrugge and Ostend, with the intention of blocking the entrances to the canals linking these ports with Bruges and thus stopping U-boat operations from the Flanders ports. Mastiff was assigned to the Ostend operation, patrolling off the port and supporting the small craft taking part in the operation. Two days later, the flotilla took part in the Royal Navy's engagement with one of the final sorties of the German High Seas Fleet during the First World War, although the two fleets did not actually meet and the destroyer returned unharmed.

After the Armistice that ended the war, the destroyer was transferred to the Local Defence Flotilla at Firth of Forth. However, as the Royal Navy returned to a peacetime level of strength, both the number of ships and personnel needed to be reduced to reduce the costs of operating the fleet. In addition, the harsh conditions of wartime operations, particularly the combination of high speed and the poor weather that is typical of the North Sea, exacerbated by the fact that the hull was not galvanised, meant that the ship was worn out. On 9 May 1921, Mastiff was retired and sold to Thos. W. Ward at Briton Ferry to be broken up. A model of the ship is in the collections of the National Maritime Museum in Greenwich.

== Pennant numbers ==
Pennant number	Date
H3A	August 1915
H72	January 1918
G16	January 1919
D66	September 1919
