= HMS Hornet (1911) =

Destroyer of the Royal Navy

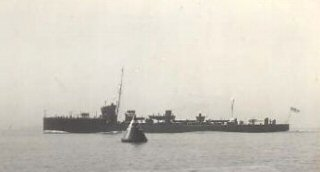
- HMS Hornet

History

United Kingdom
- Name: HMS Hornet
- Builder: John Brown & Company of Clydebank
- Yard number: 405
- Laid down: 24 January 1911
- Launched: 20 December 1911
- Fate: Sold 9 May 1921

General characteristics
- Class & type: Acheron-class destroyer
- Displacement: 990 long tons (1,010 t)
- Length: 246 ft (75 m)
- Beam: 26 ft (7.9 m)
- Draught: 8.9 ft (2.7 m)
- Installed power: 13,500 shp (10,100 kW)
- Propulsion: 2 × Brown-Curtis steam turbines; 2 × Yarrow boilers; 2 × shafts
- Speed: 28 kn (32 mph; 52 km/h)
- Complement: 72
- Armament: 2 × BL 4 in (100 mm) L/40 Mark VIII guns; 2 × QF 12 pounder 12 cwt naval guns; 2 × 21 inch (533 mm) torpedo tubes

HMS Hornet was an Acheron-class destroyer of the Royal Navy that served during the First World War and was sold for breaking in 1921. She was the seventh Royal Navy ship to be named Hornet, after the insect.

== Construction ==
She was built under the 1910-11 shipbuilding programme by John Brown & Company of Clydebank, Glasgow. She (and her sister ships Hind and Hydra) differed from the standard Admiralty I-class destroyer in only having two shafts instead of three. They had two Brown-Curtis type steam turbines, and twin boilers. Capable of 28 kn (32 mph; 52 km/h), she carried two 4 in (100 mm) guns, other smaller guns and two 21 inch (533 mm) torpedo tubes and had a complement of 72 men. She was launched on 20 December 1911.

== Pennant Numbers ==
Pennant Number	From	To
H49	6 December 1914	1 January 1918
H42	1 January 1918	Early 1919
H08	Early 1919	9 May 1921

== Career ==
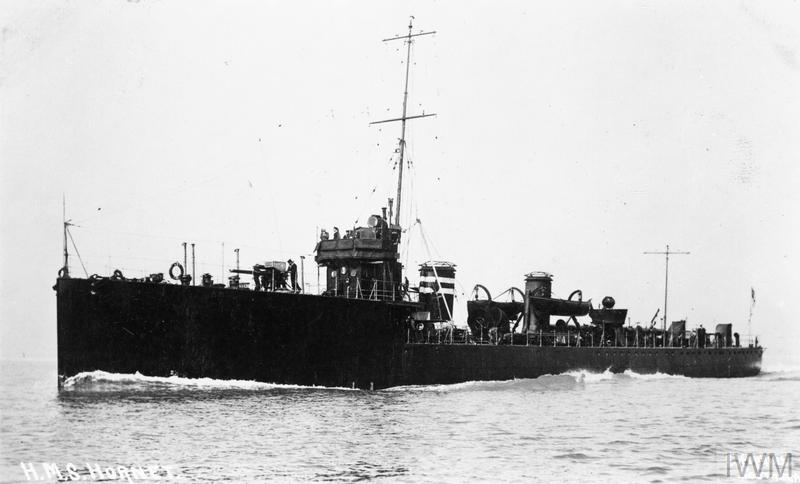
Hornet

=== Pre-War ===
Hornet served with the First Destroyer Flotilla from 1911 and, with her flotilla, joined the British Grand Fleet in 1914 on the outbreak of the First World War.

=== The Battle of Dogger Bank ===
On 24 January 1915, the First Destroyer Flotilla — including Hornet — were present at the Battle of Dogger Bank, led by the light cruiser Aurora. Her crew shared in the prize money for the German armoured cruiser Blücher.

=== Grounding of Argyll ===
The light cruiser Argyll went aground on Bell Rock near Dundee on 28 October after failing to sight the light due to a failure of communications between the ship and the lighthouse. Hornet and Jackal were diverted from their patrol to assist and rescued the crew of approximately 650; there were no fatalities.

=== Transfer to Third Battle Squadron ===
Hornet was not present with her flotilla at the Battle of Jutland on 31 May 1916. She was one of seven went with the First Destroyer Flotilla when it was transferred from the Grand Fleet to screen the Third Battle Squadron in November 1916.

=== Mediterranean Service ===
In 1917, the Third Battle Squadron was sent to the Mediterranean, where they took part in the 1918 Naval campaign in the Adriatic, including enforcing the Otranto Barrage.

On the night of 22–23 April 1918, the Tátra-class destroyers Triglav, Uzsok, Dukla, Lika and Csepel under Fregattenkapitän Karl Herkner carried out a raid to interrupt Allied shipping between Italy and Albania south of Valona (now Vlorë, Albania). Hornet, Jackal, Alarm, Comet, the Australian destroyer HMAS Torrens and the French destroyer Cimeterre were formed into three groups, with 10 mi (16 km) between each group. Jackal and Hornet encountered the Austro-Hungarian ships and turned towards, making the challenge signal. At a range of 1.5 nmi (2.8 km; 1.7 mi) the Austro-Hungarian destroyers opened fire, concentrating their fire on Hornet. Both British ships turned away, making smoke, with the intention of drawing the enemy south, but Hornet took a hit in the forward shell room and magazine, starting fires in both compartments and causing an explosion. The bridge and tiller flat both received further hits, and the rudder jammed hard over to starboard, leaving the ship circling hard under fire. Jackal turned to the east, but after approximately 15 minutes of firing, Herkner in Triglav broke off the engagement, reasoning that the alarm had certainly been raised. Jackal continued the pursuit, but the faster Austro-Hungarians pulled ahead, and she lost sight of them by 00:20. Alarm, Torrens and Cimeterre had caught up with Jackal by 00:45, but by 01:35 the pursuit was called off.

Hornet was seriously damaged, and Jackal had lost her mainmast, but the appearance of Allied reinforcements had driven the Austrians back to Cattaro (now Kotor in Montenegro). The British lost six killed (four of them in Hornet) and 25 wounded, while the Austro-Hungarians suffered no hits. Despite the one-sided casualty figures, two pre-war Royal Navy destroyers had succeeded in driving off five of the latest enemy destroyers.

Hornet was present at the entry of the Allied Fleet through the Dardanelles on 12 November. The Fleet sighted the minarets of Constantinople at 07:00 on 13 November and anchored an hour later. The destroyers maintained an anti-submarine patrol to the west of the anchored fleet.

== Disposal ==
Along with most ships of her class, she was laid up after the war, and on 9 May 1921 she was sold to Ward of Rainham for breaking.
