= HMS Goshawk (1911) =

Destroyer of the Royal Navy

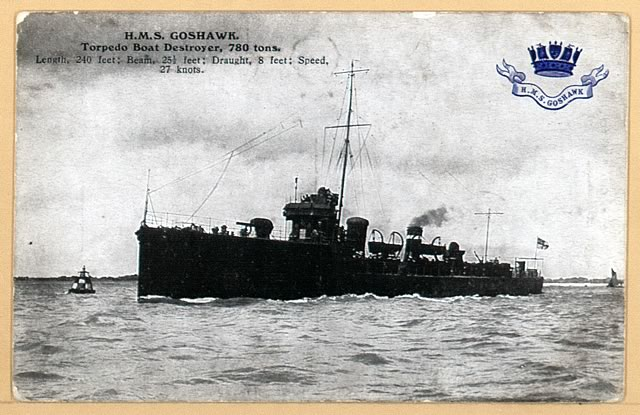
- HMS Goshawk depicted on a pre-World War I postcard

History

United Kingdom
- Name: HMS Goshawk
- Builder: William Beardmore & Company, Dalmuir
- Yard number: 501
- Launched: 18 October 1911
- Fate: Sold 4 November 1921

General characteristics
- Class & type: Acheron-class destroyer
- Displacement: 990 tons
- Length: 75 m (246 ft)
- Beam: 7.8 m (26 ft)
- Draught: 2.7 m (8.9 ft)
- Propulsion: Three Parsons Steam Turbines; Three Yarrow boilers (oil fired); 13,500 shp
- Speed: 27 kn (50 km/h)
- Complement: 70
- Armament: 2 × BL 4-inch (101.6 mm) L/40 Mark VIII guns, mounting P Mark V; 2 × QF 12 pounder 12 cwt naval gun, mounting P Mark I; 2 × single tubes for 21 inch (533 mm) torpedoes

HMS Goshawk was an Acheron-class destroyer of the Royal Navy that served during World War I and was sold for breaking in 1921. She was the sixth Royal Navy ship to be named after the bird of prey, Accipiter gentilis.

== Construction ==
She was built under the 1910–11 shipbuilding programme by William Beardmore & Company of Dalmuir and was launched on 18 October 1911. She was built to the standard Admiralty I-class design, with three Parsons steam turbines driving three shafts. Developing about 13,500 horsepower (10,100 kW), she was capable of 27 knots (50 km/h).

== Pennant Numbers ==
Pennant Number	From	To
H45	6 December 1914	1 January 1918
H37	1 January 1918	Early 1919
H59	Early 1919	4 November 1921

== Operational history ==
=== Action on 16 August 1914 ===
On 16 August 1914, within days of the outbreak of war, the First Destroyer Flotilla engaged an enemy cruiser off the mouth of the Elbe, which is reported with great verve by an author writing under the pseudonym "Clinker Knocker" in 1938:

On Aug 16th we had our first brush with the enemy, and our flotilla received a sample of German gunnery which our own gunners acknowledged was excellent. We were on our usual Dutch coast patrol, known as the 'broad fourteens' and were somewhere off the mouth of the river Elbe off the German coast. At daybreak we chased a German collier and made contact with a powerful armoured cruiser, which opened fire on us with 8.2 inch guns. Our heaviest gun was four-inch, so the enemy easily outranged us, and straddled us with her accurate salvo firing. The Goshawk and Phoenix were disabled, and shells were ricochetting over us. Fearless led us in a determined attack to close with torpedoes, but the large German Cruiser foiled our intentions by running for home, and we did not blame her. We were very disappointed, however at not being able to equalise matters with the third flotilla, but the Yorch or Roon or whichever ship it may have been was too near home for us to follow, and we left the vicinity after the Goshawk and Phoenix had patched up their wounds.

— Aye, Aye, Sir, a saga of the lower deck by Clinker Knocker

=== The Battle of Heligoland Bight ===
Goshawk took part on the Battle of Heligoland Bight on 28 August 1914, and in Commodore Tyrwhitt's despatch, her captain was singled out for praise:

It is difficult to specially pick out individuals, but the following came under my special observation ... Commander the Hon. Herbert Meade, who took his Division into action with great coolness and nerve, and was instrumental in sinking the German Destroyer V187, and with the boats of his Division saved the survivors in a most chivalrous manner.

— Commodore Reginald Tyrwhitt

=== The Battle of Dogger Bank ===
On 24 January 1915, the First Destroyer Flotilla, including Goshawk, were present at the Battle of Dogger Bank, led by the light cruiser Aurora.

=== Reassignment as submarine screen for battlecruisers ===
Early in 1915, the First Destroyer Flotilla was reassigned as a submarine screen for the Grand Fleet's battlecruisers. They moved from Harwich to the Firth of Forth on 17 March 1915.

=== The Battle of Jutland ===
Goshawk was present at the Battle of Jutland with the First Destroyer Flotilla, and her captain, Commander Dashwood Fowler Moir RN, was mentioned in despatches.

=== Mediterranean service ===
Goshawk was present at the entry of the Allied Fleet through the Dardanelles on 12 November 1918. The Fleet sighted the minarets of Constantinople at 07:00 on 13 November and anchored an hour later. The destroyers maintained an anti-submarine patrol to the west of the anchored fleet.

== Decommissioning and fate ==
In common with most of her class, she was laid up after World War I, and on 4 November 1921 she was sold to Rees of Llanelly for breaking.
