= HMS Acheron (1911) =

Destroyer of the Royal Navy

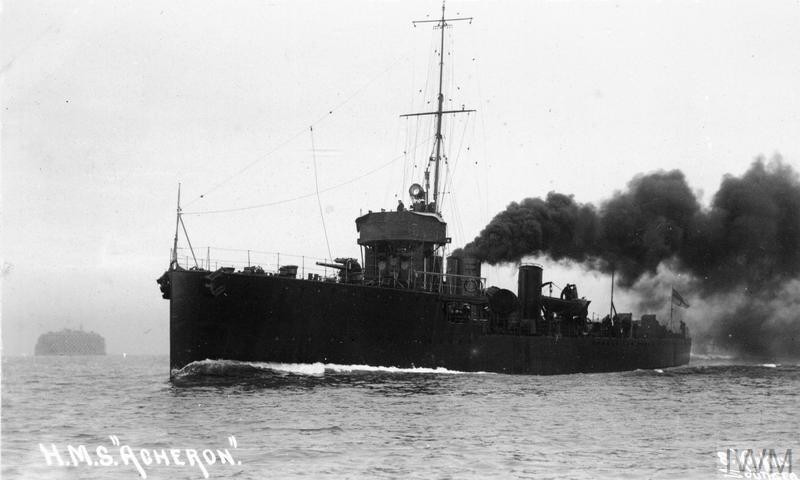
- HMS Acheron passing Spitbank Fort

History

United Kingdom
- Name: HMS Acheron
- Builder: John I. Thornycroft & Company, Woolston
- Launched: 27 June 1911
- Fate: Sold 9 May 1921

General characteristics
- Class & type: Acheron-class destroyer
- Displacement: 770 tons
- Length: 77 m (253 ft)
- Beam: 8 m (26 ft)
- Draught: 2.7 m (8.9 ft)
- Installed power: 15,500 shp (11,600 kW)
- Propulsion: 3 × Parsons steam turbines; 3 × Yarrow-type oil-fired boilers; 3 × shafts
- Speed: 29 kn (54 km/h)
- Range: 5,500 nmi at 15 kt
- Complement: 72
- Armament: 2 × BL 4-inch (101.6 mm) L/40 Mark VIII guns, mounting P Mark V; 2 × QF 12-pounder 12 cwt naval gun, mounting P Mark I; 2 × single tubes for 21 inch (533 mm) torpedoes

HMS Acheron was the name ship of the Acheron-class destroyer of the British Royal Navy. She is named after the River Acheron, believed in Greek Mythology to be a branch of the River Styx. She was the fifth ship of the Royal Navy to bear the name.

== Pennant numbers ==
Pennant number	From	To
H00	6 December 1914	1 January 1918
H02	1 January 1918	Early 1919
H05	Early 1919	9 May 1921

== Construction ==
With her sister, Ariel, she was a "Thornycroft special", and as such was slightly longer and more powerful than the standard destroyer of her class. Acheron was ordered during the building programme of 1910–11, laid down at the Woolston yard of John I. Thornycroft & Company, and launched on 27 June 1911. Capable of 29 knots (54 km/h), she carried two 4-inch (102 mm) guns, other smaller guns and 21-inch (530 mm) torpedo tubes and had a complement of 70 men.

== Career ==
Serving with the First Destroyer Flotilla, she became part of the Grand Fleet at the outbreak of war.

=== The Battle of Heligoland Bight ===
She was present with First Destroyer Flotilla on 28 August 1914 at the Battle of Heligoland Bight, led by the light cruiser Fearless.

=== The Battle of Dogger Bank ===
On 24 January 1915 the First Destroyer Flotilla, including Acheron were present at the Battle of Dogger Bank, led by the light cruiser Aurora.

=== Sinking of U-12 ===
On 10 March 1915, in company with her sisters Attack and Ariel, Acheron was searching for a German submarine reported by the trawler Man Island near Aberdeen. At 10:10 am Attack sighted U-12 and opened fire. Ariel sighted the submarine at 10:12 am at about 2 nautical miles (3.7 km) and all three destroyers turned towards it. U-12 dived and raised her periscope, which Ariel sighted at a distance of 200 yards (180 m). She turned to ram, sighting the conning tower under the water in the final moments before she struck the submarine at a fine angle. Within two minutes the submarine had returned to the surface so that the crew could escape, but they found the conning tower hatch jammed, and most of the survivors managed their escape via the other hatches. Acheron and the other destroyers opened fire as the submarine lay on the surface, killing and injuring some of the escaping sailors. At 10:30 am U-12 sank approximately in position 56°15′N 1°56′W, and the destroyers picked up 10 survivors; 19 lives had been lost. The damage to Ariel's bows was so serious that she had to be towed into port.

=== The Battle of Jutland ===
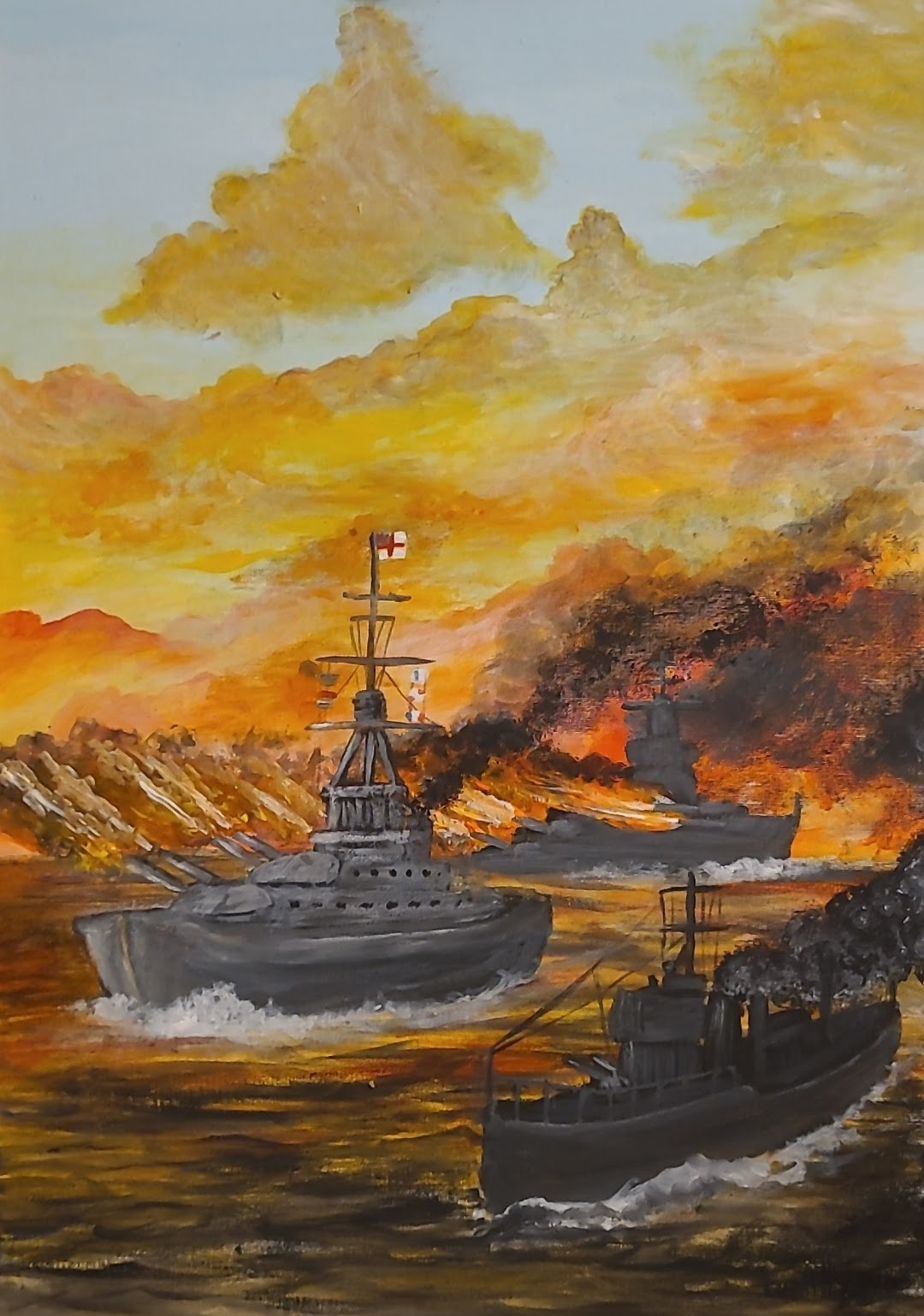
Painting of HMS Acheron (front right) at the battle of Jutland, by Toby Roberts

Acheron served at Battle of Jutland on 31 May 1916 as part of her flotilla under the command of Charles Ramsey.

=== Mediterranean service ===
From 1917 the Third Battle Squadron was deployed to the Mediterranean. Acheron was present at the entry of the Allied fleet through the Dardanelles on 12 November 1918.

== Disposal ==
Acheron was sold on 9 May 1921 to Ward for breaking. She was sold again on 20 September 1923 to J J King.
