= HMS Forester (1911) =

Acheron-class destroyer of the Royal Navy

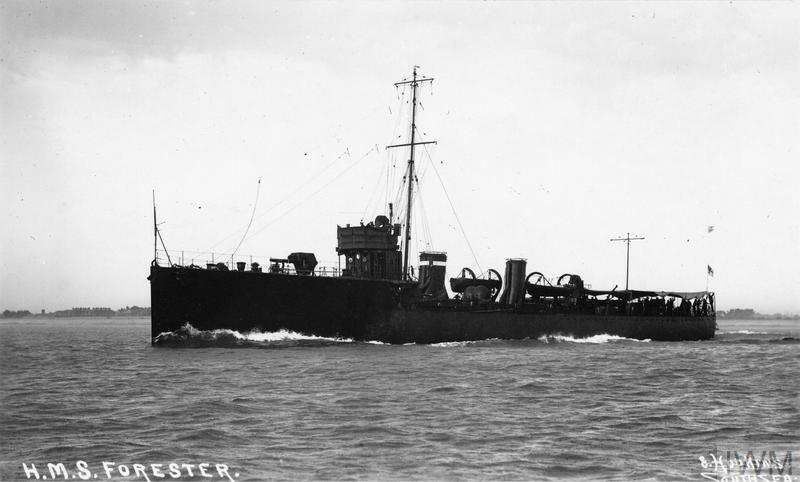
- HMS Forester

History

United Kingdom
- Name: HMS Forester
- Builder: J. Samuel White & Company, Cowes
- Launched: 1 June 1911
- Fate: Sold November 1921

General characteristics
- Class & type: Acheron-class destroyer
- Displacement: 760 tons
- Length: 246 ft (75 m)
- Beam: 26 ft (7.9 m)
- Draught: 9 ft (2.7 m)
- Installed power: Three White-Forster boilers (oil fired); 13,500 shp (10,100 kW)
- Propulsion: Three Parsons Turbines; Three shafts
- Speed: 30 kn (56 km/h)
- Complement: 72
- Armament: 2 × BL 4-inch (101.6 mm) L/40 Mark VIII guns, mounting P Mark V; 2 × QF 12 pounder 12 cwt naval gun, mounting P Mark I; 2 × single tubes for 21 inch (533 mm) torpedoes

HMS Forester was an Acheron-class destroyer of the Royal Navy that served during World War I and was sold for breaking in 1921. She was the ninth Royal Navy ship to be named after the traditional craft of forester.

== Construction ==
She was built under the 1910-11 shipbuilding programme by J. Samuel White & Company of Cowes. She had three Parsons turbines, and three White-Forster boilers. Capable of 30 knots, she carried two 4-inch guns, other smaller guns and two 21 inch (533 mm) torpedo tubes and had a complement of 72 men. She was launched on 1 June 1911.

== Pennant numbers ==
Pennant number	From	To
H39	6 December 1914	1 January 1918
H34	1 January 1918	Early 1919
H58	Early 1919	9 May 1921

== Career ==
=== Pre-War ===
Forester served with the First Destroyer Flotilla from 1911 and, with her flotilla, joined the British Grand Fleet in 1914 on the outbreak of World War I.

=== The Battle of Heligoland Bight ===
She was present with First Destroyer Flotilla on 28 August 1914 at the Battle of Heligoland Bight, led by the light cruiser Fearless, and shared in the prize money for the battle.

=== The Battle of Dogger Bank ===
On 24 January 1915, the First Destroyer Flotilla, including Forester, were present at the Battle of Dogger Bank, led by the light cruiser Aurora. Her crew shared in the Prize Money for the German armoured cruiser Blücher.

=== Transfer to Third Battle Squadron ===
Forester was not present with her flotilla at the Battle of Jutland on 31 May 1916. She was one of seven destroyers to go with the First Destroyer Flotilla when it was transferred from the Grand Fleet to screen the Third Battle Squadron in November 1916.

=== HMAT Berrima ===
On 18 February 1917, 50 miles west of Portland Bill, HMAT Berrima was struck a mine in the English Channel. Four people died, but the greater part of the crew took to the lifeboats and were picked up by Forester. A tow was passed and she was taken under tow into Portland Harbour the next day. She was subsequently repaired and returned to service.

=== Mediterranean service ===
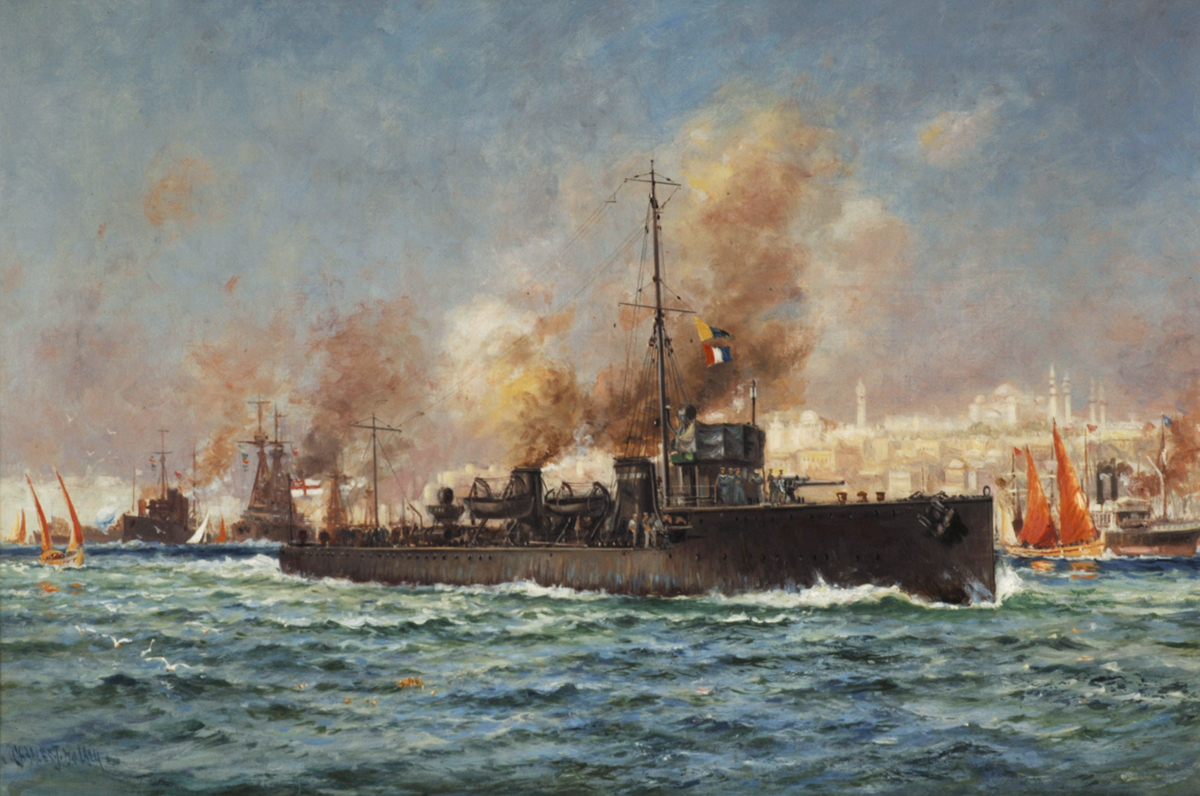
Destroyer 'Forester' off Constantinople by Charles John De Lacey

From 1917 the Third Battle Squadron was deployed to the Mediterranean. Forester was present at the entry of the Allied Fleet through the Dardanelles on 12 November 1918. Charles de Lacy painted Forester off Constantinople and this painting is in the Cowes Maritime Museum.

== Disposal ==
In common with most of her class, she was laid up after World War I, and on 4 November 1921 she was sold to Rees of Llanelli for breaking.
