= HMS Archer (1911) =

Destroyer of the Royal Navy

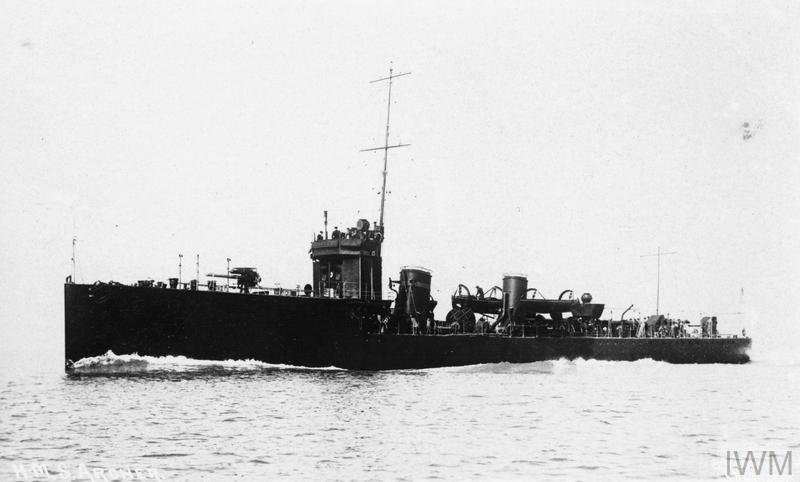
- Archer

History

United Kingdom
- Name: Archer
- Builder: Yarrow & Company, Scotstoun
- Yard number: 1296
- Laid down: 1 September 1910
- Launched: 21 October 1911
- Commissioned: March 1912
- Fate: Sold for scrap, May 1921

General characteristics
- Class & type: Acheron-class destroyer
- Displacement: 775 long tons (787 t)
- Length: 246 ft 2 in (75 m)
- Beam: 25 ft 8 in (7.8 m)
- Draught: 8 ft 9 in (2.7 m)
- Installed power: 3 Yarrow boilers; 16,000 shp (12,000 kW)
- Propulsion: 2 shafts; 1 steam turbine
- Speed: 28 knots (52 km/h; 32 mph)
- Range: 1,620 nmi (3,000 km; 1,860 mi) at 15 knots (28 km/h; 17 mph)
- Complement: 70
- Armament: 2 × single 4 in (102 mm) guns; 2 × single 12 pdr (3 in (76 mm) gun; 2 × single 21 in (533 mm) torpedo tubes

HMS Archer was one of 20 Acheron-class destroyers built for the Royal Navy in the 1910s. She was one of the two Yarrow Specials with which the builder was given more freedom in an effort to increase speeds beyond the rest of the class. Completed in 1912 the ship served during the First World War and was sold in 1921.

== Design and description ==
The Acheron class was a repeat of the preceding Acorn class, although the Admiralty allowed three builders, including Yarrow, more freedom to modify the design of two of their ships apiece in hopes that they might be able to improve upon the speeds previously attained. The Yarrow Specials had an overall length of 246 feet 2 inches (75 m), a beam of 25 feet 8 inches (7.8 m), and a deep draught of 8 feet 9 inches (2.7 m). The ships displaced 775 long tons (787 t) at deep load and their crew numbered 70 officers and ratings.

Archer was powered by a single Brown-Curtis steam turbine that drove two propeller shafts using steam provided by three Yarrow boilers. The engines developed a total of 16,000 shaft horsepower (12,000 kW) and were designed for a speed of 28 knots (52 km/h; 32 mph). The ship reached a speed of 30.3 knots (56.1 km/h; 34.9 mph) from 18,537 shp (13,823 kW) during her sea trials. The Acherons had a range of 1,620 nautical miles (3,000 km; 1,860 mi) at a cruising speed of 15 knots (28 km/h; 17 mph).

The primary armament of the ships consisted of a pair of BL 4-inch (102 mm) Mk VIII guns in single, unprotected pivot mounts fore and aft of the superstructure. They were also armed with two single QF 12-pounder (3-inch (76 mm)) guns, one on each broadside abreast the bridge. The destroyers were equipped with a pair of single rotating mounts for 21-inch (533 mm) torpedo tubes amidships and carried two reload torpedoes.

== Construction and career ==
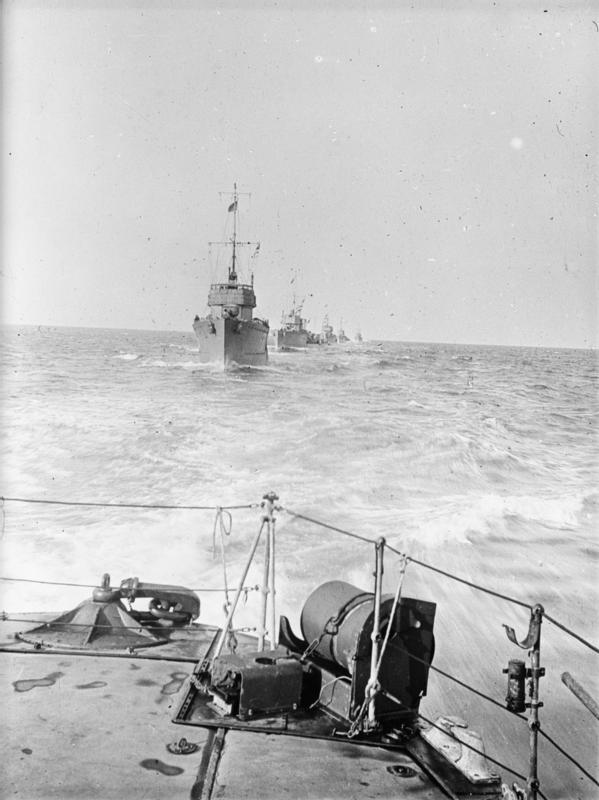
Destroyers of the Harwich Force

Archer, the fourth ship of the name to serve in the Royal Navy, was ordered under the 1910–1911 Naval Programme from Yarrow & Company. She was laid down at the company's shipyard in Scotstoun on 1 September 1910, launched on 21 October 1911 and commissioned in March 1912.

From 1917 the Third Battle Squadron was deployed to the Mediterranean. Archer was present at the entry of the Allied fleet through the Dardanelles on 12 November 1918. She was sold to Thos. W. Ward for scrap on 9 May 1921.

== Pennant numbers ==
Pennant Number	From	To
H10	6 December 1914	1 September 1915
H29	1 September 1915	1 January 1918
H06	1 January 1918	Sold 9 May 1921

== Bibliography ==
- Colledge, J. J.; Warlow, Ben (2006) [1969]. Ships of the Royal Navy: The Complete Record of All Fighting Ships of the Royal Navy from the 15th Century to the Present (3rd Rev ed.). London: Chatham Publishing. ISBN 978-1-86176-281-8. OCLC 67375475.
- Friedman, Norman (2009). British Destroyers: From Earliest Days to the Second World War. Barnsley, UK: Seaforth Publishing. ISBN 978-1-84832-049-9.
- Gardiner, Robert & Gray, Randal, eds. (1985). Conway's All The World's Fighting Ships 1906–1921. London: Conway Maritime Press. ISBN 0-85177-245-5.
- March, Edgar J. (1966). British Destroyers: A History of Development, 1892–1953; Drawn by Admiralty Permission From Official Records & Returns, Ships' Covers & Building Plans. London: Seeley Service. OCLC 164893555.
