= HMS Jackal (1911) =

Destroyer of the Royal Navy

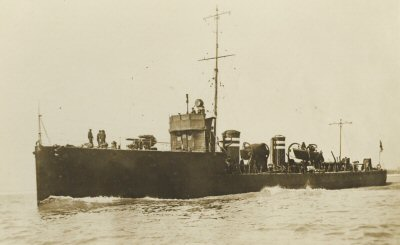
- HMS Jackal in pre-war black paint, with funnel bands

History

United Kingdom
- Name: Jackal
- Builder: R. W. Hawthorn Leslie & Company, Hebburn
- Launched: 9 September 1911
- Fate: Sold, 28 September 1920

General characteristics
- Class & type: Acheron-class destroyer
- Displacement: 990 long tons (1,010 t)
- Length: 246 ft (75 m)
- Beam: 26 ft (7.9 m)
- Draught: 8.9 ft (2.7 m)
- Installed power: 13,500 shp (10,100 kW)
- Propulsion: 3 × Parsons steam turbines; 3 × Yarrow boilers; 3 × shafts
- Speed: 27 knots (50 km/h; 31 mph)
- Complement: 70
- Armament: 2 × BL 4 in (100 mm) L/40 Mark VIII guns; 2 × QF 12-pounder 12 cwt naval guns; 2 × 21-inch (533 mm) torpedo tubes

HMS Jackal was an Acheron-class destroyer of the Royal Navy that served during the World War I and was sold for breaking in 1920. She was the seventh Royal Navy ship to be named Jackal, after the predatory mammal of the same name.

== Construction ==
She was built under the 1910–11 shipbuilding programme by R. W. Hawthorn Leslie & Company of Hebburn, Tyneside to an Admiralty design and was launched on 9 September 1911.

== Career ==
=== Pre-War ===
Jackal served with the First Destroyer Flotilla from 1911 and, with her flotilla, joined the British Grand Fleet in 1914 on the outbreak of the First World War.

=== The Battle of Heligoland Bight ===
She was present on 28 August 1914 at the Battle of Heligoland Bight, detached from the First Destroyer Flotilla along with Badger, Beaver and Sandfly. She shared in the prize money for the engagement.

=== The Battle of Dogger Bank ===
On 24 January 1915, the First Destroyer Flotilla — including Jackal — were present at the Battle of Dogger Bank, led by the light cruiser Aurora. Her crew shared in the prize money for the German armoured cruiser Blücher.

=== Grounding of Argyll ===
The light cruiser Argyll went aground on Bell Rock near Dundee on 28 October after failing to sight the light due to a failure of communications between the ship and the lighthouse. Jackal and Hornet were diverted from their patrol to assist and rescued the crew of approximately 650; there were no fatalities.

=== SS Lanfranc ===
At 19:30 on 17 April 1917, the hospital ship HMHS Lanfranc was torpedoed 4 mi (6.4 km) northeast of Le Havre by UB-40 while bound for Southampton. At the time, she had 387 patients, of which 167 were German prisoners of war, and of these patients, 326 were cot-bound. Approximately 570 survivors were picked up by Badger and Jackal, aided by the P-class patrol boat P.47 and the French patrol boat Roitelet, and taken to Portsmouth.

=== Mediterranean Service ===
In 1917, the Third Battle Squadron was sent to the Mediterranean, where they took part in the 1918 Naval campaign in the Adriatic, including enforcing the Otranto Barrage.

On the night of 22–23 April 1918, the Tátra-class destroyers Triglav, Uzsok, Dukla, Lika and Csepel under Fregattenkapitän Karl Herkner carried out a raid to interrupt Allied shipping between Italy and Albania south of Valona (now Vlorë, Albania). Jackal, Hornet, Alarm, Comet, the Australian destroyer HMAS Torrens and the French destroyer Cimeterre were formed into three groups, with 10 mi (16 km) between each group. Jackal and Hornet encountered the Austro-Hungarian ships and turned towards, making the challenge signal. At a range of 1.5 nmi (1.7 mi; 2.8 km) the Austro-Hungarian destroyers opened fire, concentrating their fire on Hornet. Both British ships turned away, making smoke, with the intention of drawing the enemy south, but Hornet took a hit in the forward shell room and magazine, starting fires in both compartments and causing an explosion. The bridge and tiller flat both received further hits, and the rudder jammed hard over to starboard, leaving the ship circling hard under fire. Jackal was turned to the east by her captain — Lieutenant-Commander A M Roberts — but after approximately 15 minutes of firing, Herkner in Triglav broke off the engagement, reasoning that the alarm had certainly been raised. Jackal continued the pursuit, but the faster Austro-Hungarians pulled ahead, and she lost sight of them by 00:20. Alarm, Torrens and Cimeterre had caught up with Jackal by 00:45, but by 01:35 the pursuit was called off.

Hornet was seriously damaged, and Jackal had lost her mainmast, but the appearance of Allied reinforcements had driven the Austrians back to Cattaro (now Kotor in Montenegro). The British lost seven killed (including two in Jackal) and 25 wounded, while the Austro-Hungarians suffered no hits. Despite the one-sided casualty figures, two pre-war Royal Navy destroyers had succeeded in driving off five of the latest enemy destroyers.

Jackal was present at the entry of the Allied Fleet through the Dardanelles on 12 November. The Fleet sighted the minarets of Constantinople at 07:00 on 13 November and anchored an hour later. The destroyers maintained an anti-submarine patrol to the west of the anchored fleet.

== Disposal ==
HMS Jackal at Malta

Along with most ships of her class, she was laid up after the war, and on 28 September 1920 she was sold to J Smith for breaking.

== Pennant numbers ==
Pennant Number	From	To
H55	6 December 1914	1 January 1918
H44	1 January 1918	Early 1919
H95	Early 1919	28 September 1920
