= HMS Sandfly (1911) =

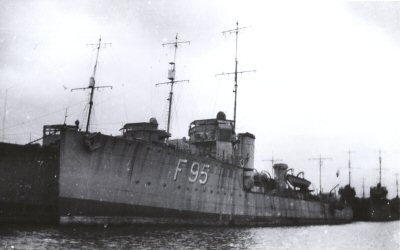
- HMS Sandfly

History

United Kingdom
- Name: HMS Sandfly
- Builder: Swan Hunter, Wallsend
- Launched: 9 July 1911
- Fate: Sold 9 May 1921

General characteristics
- Class & type: Acheron-class destroyer
- Displacement: 750 tons
- Length: 246 ft (75 m)
- Beam: 26 ft (7.9 m)
- Draught: 9 ft (2.7 m)
- Installed power: 13,500 shp (10,100 kW)
- Propulsion: Three Parsons Turbines; Three Yarrows boilers (oil fired); Three shafts
- Speed: 28 kn (52 km/h)
- Complement: 72
- Armament: 2 × BL 4-inch (101.6 mm) L/40 Mark VIII guns, mounting P Mark V; 2 × QF 12 pounder 12 cwt naval gun, mounting P Mark I; 2 × single tubes for 21 inch (533 mm) torpedoes

HMS Sandfly was an Acheron-class destroyer of the Royal Navy that served during World War I and was sold for breaking in 1921. She was the seventh Royal Navy ship to be named after the small biting fly of the same name.

== Construction ==
She was built under the 1910-11 shipbuilding programme by Swan Hunter of Wallsend. She had three Parsons turbines, and three Yarrows boilers. Capable of 28 knots, she carried two 4-inch guns, other smaller guns and two 21 inch (533 mm) torpedo tubes and had a complement of 72 men. She was launched on 9 July 1911.

== Pennant numbers ==
Pennant number	From	To
H87	6 December 1914	1 January 1918
H99	1 January 1918	Early 1919
H63	Early 1919	9 May 1921

== Career ==
=== Pre-war ===
Sandfly served with the First Destroyer Flotilla from 1911 and, with her flotilla, joined the British Grand Fleet in 1914 on the outbreak of World War I.

=== The Battle of Heligoland Bight ===
She was present on 28 August 1914 at the Battle of Heligoland Bight, detached from the First Destroyer Flotilla along with Badger, Beaver and Jackal. She shared in the prize money for the engagement.

=== The Battle of Dogger Bank ===
On 24 January 1915, the First Destroyer Flotilla, including Sandfly, were present at the Battle of Dogger Bank, led by the light cruiser HMS Aurora. Her crew shared in the prize money for the German armoured cruiser SMS Blücher.

=== Transfer to Third Battle Squadron ===
Sandfly was one of seven destroyers to go with the First Destroyer Flotilla when it was transferred from the Grand Fleet to screen the Third Battle Squadron in November 1916.

=== Conversion to minelayer ===
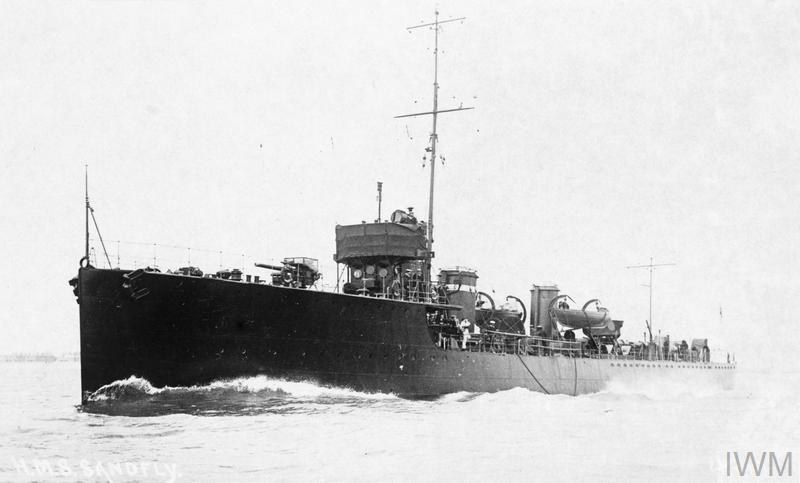
HMS Sandfly

In 1917 the Acheron-class destroyers Ferret, Sandfly and Ariel were converted to minelaying destroyers, capable of carrying 40 mines. Sandfly served with the 20th Flotilla, and operated out of Immingham.

=== SS Miniota ===
On 31 August 1917 Sandfly went to the aid of SS Miniota of the Canadian Pacific Line when she was torpedoed by SM U-19 30 nautical miles (56 km) off Start Point. Miniota was badly holed and sinking by the bow, which made her difficult to tow, and when efforts to tow her into Portland Harbour failed, she sank in 68 metres (37 fathoms) of water.

== Disposal ==
In common with the survivors of her class, she was laid up after World War I, and on 9 May 1921 she was sold to Thos. W. Ward for scrap.
