= HMS Druid (1911) =

Destroyer of the Royal Navy

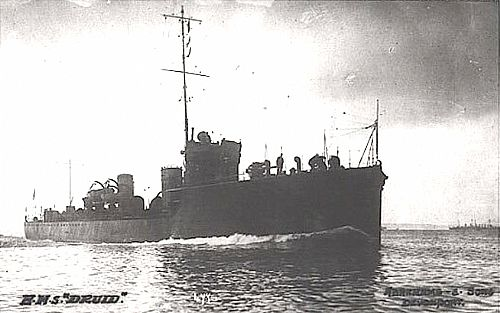
- Druid

History

United Kingdom
- Name: Druid
- Builder: William Denny & Brothers, Dumbarton
- Yard number: 936
- Laid down: 8 November 1910
- Launched: 4 December 1911
- Commissioned: April 1912
- Fate: Sold for scrap, 9 May 1921

General characteristics
- Class & type: Acheron-class destroyer
- Displacement: 778 long tons (790 t)
- Length: 246 ft (75 m)
- Beam: 25 ft 8 in (7.8 m)
- Draught: 8 ft 9 in (2.7 m)
- Installed power: 3 Yarrow boilers; 13,500 shp (10,100 kW)
- Propulsion: 3 shafts; 1 steam turbine
- Speed: 27 knots (50 km/h; 31 mph)
- Range: 1,620 nmi (3,000 km; 1,860 mi) at 15 knots (28 km/h; 17 mph)
- Complement: 70
- Armament: 2 × single 4 in (102 mm) guns; 2 × single 12 pdr (3 in (76 mm) gun; 2 × single 21 in (533 mm) torpedo tubes

HMS Druid was one of 20 Acheron-class destroyers built for the Royal Navy during the 1910s. Completed in 1912 the ship served during World War I and was sold for scrap in 1921.

== Design and description ==
The Acheron class was a repeat of the preceding Acorn class. The Admiralty provided general specifications, but each shipyard did their own detailed design so that ships often varied in size. The Acherons had an overall length of 246 feet (75 m), a beam of 23 feet 8 inches (7.2 m), and a deep draught of 8 feet 9 inches (2.7 m). The ships displaced 778 long tons (790 t) at deep load and their crew numbered 70 officers and ratings.

The destroyers were powered by a single Parsons steam turbine that drove three propeller shafts using steam provided by three Yarrow boilers. The engines developed a total of 13,500 shaft horsepower (10,100 kW) and were designed for a speed of 27 knots (50 km/h; 31 mph). Druid reached a speed of 28.3 knots (52.4 km/h; 32.6 mph) from 15,014 shp (11,196 kW) during her sea trials. The Acherons had a range of 1,620 nautical miles (3,000 km; 1,860 mi) at a cruising speed of 15 knots (28 km/h; 17 mph).

The primary armament of the ships consisted of a pair of BL 4-inch (102 mm) Mk VIII guns in single, unprotected pivot mounts fore and aft of the superstructure. They were also armed with two single QF 12-pounder (3-inch (76 mm)) guns, one on each broadside abreast the bridge. The destroyers were equipped with a pair of single rotating mounts for 21-inch (533 mm) torpedo tubes amidships and carried two reload torpedoes.

== Construction and career ==
Druid, the sixth ship in the Royal Navy of that name, was ordered under the 1910–1911 Naval Programme from William Denny & Brothers. The ship was laid down at the company's Dumbarton shipyard on 8 November 1910, launched on 4 December 1911 and commissioned in April 1912.

=== Battle of Heligoland Bight ===
She was present with the First Destroyer Flotilla on 28 August 1914 at the Battle of Heligoland Bight, led by the scout cruiser Fearless. Druid suffered one man wounded during the action and shared in the prize money for the engagement.

=== Battle of Dogger Bank ===
On 24 January 1915 the First Destroyer Flotilla, including Druid, were present at the Battle of Dogger Bank, led by the light cruiser Aurora. Her battle ensign from the engagement is preserved at the Ceiriog Memorial Institute in Wales. Her crew shared in the prize money for the German armoured cruiser Blücher.

From 1917 the Third Battle Squadron was deployed to the Mediterranean. Druid was present at the entry of the Allied fleet through the Dardanelles on 12 November 1918.

In common with most of her class, she was laid up after World War I, and on 9 May 1921 she was sold to Thos. W. Ward of Briton Ferry for breaking.

== Pennant numbers ==
Pennant number	From	To
H33	6 December 1914	1 January 1918
H30	1 January 1918	Early 1919
H92	Early 1919	9 May 1921
