= HMS Hydra (1912) =

Destroyer of the Royal Navy

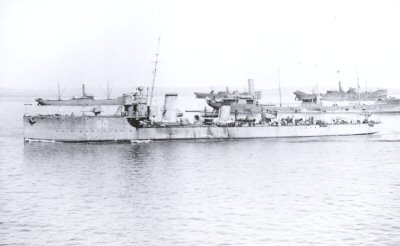
- Hydra during World War I

History

United Kingdom
- Name: Hydra
- Builder: John Brown & Company, Clydebank
- Yard number: 406
- Laid down: 7 February 1911
- Launched: 19 February 1912
- Commissioned: June 1912
- Fate: Sold for scrap, 9 May 1921

General characteristics
- Class & type: Acheron-class destroyer
- Displacement: 778 long tons (790 t)
- Length: 246 ft (75 m)
- Beam: 25 ft 8 in (7.8 m)
- Draught: 8 ft 9 in (2.7 m)
- Installed power: 3 Yarrow boilers; 13,500 shp (10,100 kW)
- Propulsion: 2 shafts; 1 steam turbine
- Speed: 27 knots (50 km/h; 31 mph)
- Range: 1,620 nmi (3,000 km; 1,860 mi) at 15 knots (28 km/h; 17 mph)
- Complement: 70
- Armament: 2 × single 4 in (102 mm) guns; 2 × single 12 pdr (3 in (76 mm) gun; 2 × single 21 in (533 mm) torpedo tubes

HMS Hydra was one of 20 Acheron-class destroyers built for the Royal Navy in the 1910s. Completed in 1912, the ship participated in World War I and was sold for scrap in 1921.

== Design and description ==
The Acheron class was a repeat of the preceding Acorn class. The Admiralty provided general specifications, but each shipyard did their own detailed design so that ships often varied in size. The Acherons had an overall length of 246 feet (75 m), a beam of 23 feet 8 inches (7.2 m), and a draught of 8 feet 9 inches (2.7 m). The ships displaced 778 long tons (790 t) at deep load and their crew numbered 70 officers and ratings.

Hydra was powered by a single Brown-Curtis steam turbine that drove both propeller shafts using steam provided by three Yarrow boilers. The engines developed a total of 13,500 shaft horsepower (10,100 kW) and were designed for a speed of 27 knots (50 km/h; 31 mph). The ship reached a speed of 28.1 knots (52.0 km/h; 32.3 mph) from 14,710 shp (10,970 kW) during her sea trials. The Acherons had a range of 1,620 nautical miles (3,000 km; 1,860 mi) at a cruising speed of 15 knots (28 km/h; 17 mph).

The primary armament of the ships consisted of a pair of BL 4-inch (102 mm) Mk VIII guns in single, unprotected pivot mounts fore and aft of the superstructure. They were also armed with two single QF 12-pounder (3-inch (76 mm)) guns, one on each broadside abreast the bridge. The destroyers were equipped with a pair of single rotating mounts for 21-inch (533 mm) torpedo tubes amidships and carried two reload torpedoes.

== Construction and career ==
Hydra was ordered under the 1910–1911 Naval Programme from John Brown & Company. The ship was laid down at the company's Clydebank shipyard on 7 February 1911, launched on 19 February 1912 and commissioned in June.

=== The Battle of Dogger Bank ===
Hydra was with the First Destroyer Flotilla at the Battle of Dogger Bank on 24 January 1915.

=== The Battle of Jutland ===
She was present at the Battle of Jutland on 31 May 1916. Along with the rest of the flotilla, she was transferred to the 3rd Battle Squadron, based at Portsmouth.

She collided with a merchant ship on the night of 11 February 1917 in the English Channel. The captain of Hydra was held liable for the collision because, although the other ship showed him a light, he did not perceive that it was on a crossing course.

=== Mediterranean service ===
From 1917 the Third Battle Squadron was deployed to the Mediterranean. Hydra was present at the entry of the Allied Fleet through the Dardanelles on 12 November 1918. On 9 February 1921, Hydra collided with the Royal Navy torpedo boat Z 3 in the Weilingen Channel and sank. Z 3 rescued all 72 of Hydra′s crew. The ship was sold on 9 May 1921 to Thos. W. Ward of Portishead for scrap.

== Pennant numbers ==
Pennant Number	From	To
H50	6 December 1914	1 January 1918
H43	1 January 1918	Early 1919
H94	Early 1919	9 May 1921
