= RMS Campania =

British ocean liner

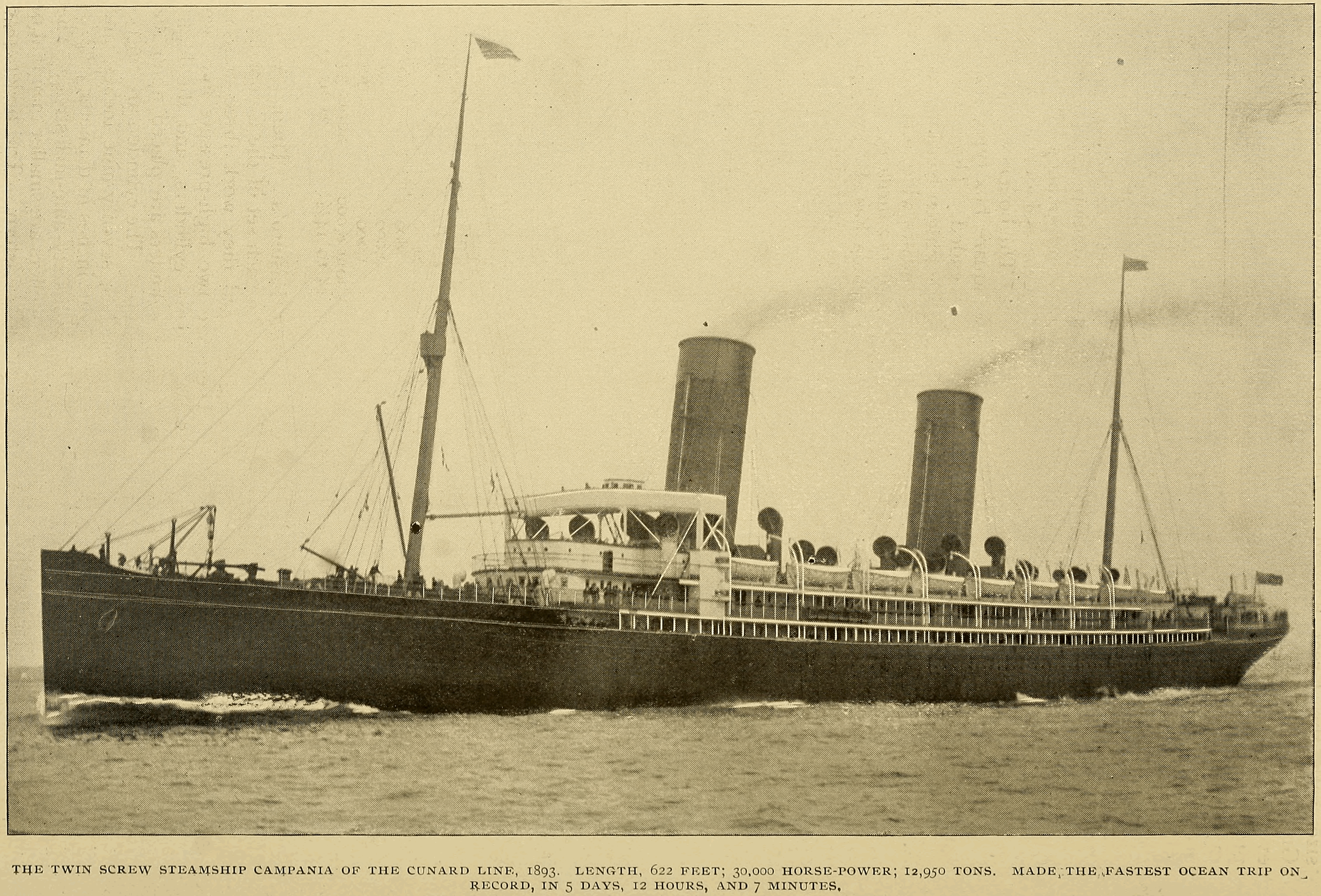
- The RMS Campania

History

United Kingdom
- Name: RMS Campania
- Namesake: Campania
- Owner: Cunard Line
- Port of registry: Liverpool, United Kingdom
- Builder: Fairfield Shipbuilding and Engineering Company, yard in Govan, Scotland
- Yard number: 364
- Laid down: 22 September 1891
- Launched: 8 September 1892
- Christened: Lady Burns
- Maiden voyage: 22 April 1893
- Fate: Sunk in a collision with HMS Glorious, 5 November 1918

General characteristics
- Tonnage: 12,950 GRT; 4,973 NRT
- Displacement: 18,450 tons
- Length: 622 ft (189.6 m)
- Beam: 65 ft 3 in (19.9 m)
- Draft: 29.9 feet
- Depth: 41 ft 10 in (13.7m)
- Installed power: 12 double-ended Scotch boilers, 102 furnaces. Two five-cylinder triple expansion engines producing 31000shp direct to twin screws
- Propulsion: Two triple blade propellers
- Speed: Service speed 22 knots (40.5 km/h / 25.3 mph); top speed 23.5 knots (43.3 km/h / 27 mph)
- Capacity: 600 first class, 400 second class, 1,000 third class. 2,000 total
- Crew: 424

RMS Campania was a British ocean liner owned by the Cunard Line, built by Fairfield Shipbuilding and Engineering Company of Govan, Scotland, and launched on Thursday, 8 September 1892.

Identical in dimensions and specifications to her sister ship RMS Lucania, Campania was the largest and fastest passenger liner afloat when she entered service in 1893. She crossed the Atlantic in less than six days, and on her second voyage in 1893, she won the prestigious Blue Riband, previously held by the Inman Liner SS City of Paris. The following year, Lucania won the Blue Riband and kept the title until 1898 - Campania being the marginally slower of the two sisters.

== Power plant and construction ==
One of Campania's triple expansion engines.

Campania and Lucania were partly financed by the Admiralty. The deal was that Cunard would receive money from the Government in return for constructing vessels to admiralty specifications and also on condition that the vessels go on the naval reserve list to serve as armed merchant cruisers when required by the government. The contracts were awarded to the Fairfield Shipbuilding and Engineering Company, which at the time was one of Britain's biggest producers of warships. Plans were soon drawn up for a large, twin-screw steamer powered by triple expansion engines, and construction began in 1891, just 43 days after Cunards' order.

Campania and Lucania had the largest triple expansion engines ever fitted to a Cunard ship, also the largest in the world at the time, and rank amongst the largest of the type ever constructed. The engines were 47 feet in height, reaching from the double-bottom floor of the engine room almost to the top of the superstructure - over five decks. Each engine had five cylinders: two high pressure cylinders, each measuring 37 in (940 mm) in diameter; one intermediate pressure cylinder measuring 79 in (2,000 mm) in diameter; and two low pressure cylinders, each measuring 98 in (2,500 mm) in diameter. They operated with a stroke of 69 in (1,800 mm). Steam was raised from twelve double-end Scotch boilers, each measuring 18 ft (5.5 m) in diameter and having eight furnaces. There was also one single-ended boiler for auxiliary machinery and one smaller donkey boiler. Boiler pressure was 165 psi (1,140 kPa), enabling the engines to produce 31,000 ihp (23,000 kW), which translated to an average speed of 22 knots (41 km/h), and a record speed of 23½ knots. Normal operating speed for the engines was about 79 rpm.

Each engine was located in a separate watertight engine compartment. In the case of a hull breach in that area, only one engine room would then be flooded, and the ship would still have use of the adjacent engine. In addition to this, Campania had 16 transverse water-tight compartments with water-tight doors that could be manually closed on command from the telegraph on the bridge. She could remain afloat with any two compartments flooded.

During Campania's first trips across the Atlantic, hull vibration was noted to be a problem and sea-spray had been a nuisance to passengers in heavy seas. This led to design modifications being made to Lucania, which was still under construction. The modifications to Lucania proved to be successful, so Cunard decided to make similar modifications to Campania. Campania was returned to the builder's yard and her aft section was strengthened to reduce the vibration. Also, her promenade deck was extended over the forward and aft well-decks. The sides of the well-decks were fully enclosed by plating which extended some way along the lower promenade. While the aft well deck was left open from above, the forward well deck and gangway over it were dispensed with completely. The new forward design would be echoed 14 years later in the design of the Lusitania and Mauretania.

== Passenger accommodation ==
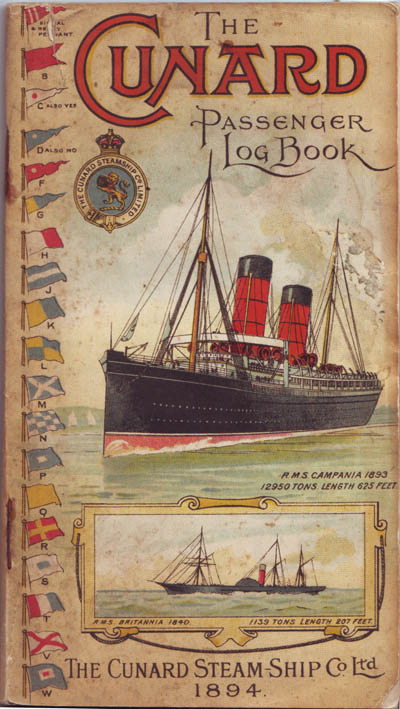
Handbook issued to passengers on Campania

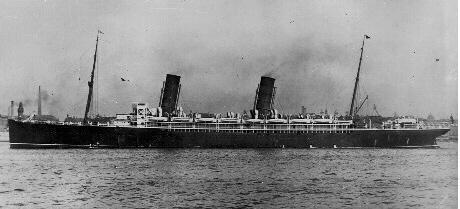

In their day, Campania and her sister offered the most luxurious first-class passenger accommodation available. According to maritime historian Basil Greenhill, in his book Merchant Steamships, the interiors of Campania and Lucania represented Victorian opulence at its peak — an expression of a highly confident and prosperous age that would never be quite repeated on any other ship. Greenhill remarked that later vessels' interiors degenerated into "grandiose vulgarity, the classical syntax debased to mere jargon".

All the first-class public rooms, and the en-suite staterooms of the upper deck, were generally heavily paneled in oak, satinwood or mahogany; and thickly carpeted. Velvet curtains hung aside the windows and portholes, while the furniture was richly upholstered in matching design. The "French Renaissance" style was applied to the forward first-class entrance hall, whilst the 1st class smoking room was in "Elizabethan style", comprising heavy oak panels surrounding the first open fireplace ever to be used aboard a passenger liner.

Perhaps the finest room in the vessels was the first class dining saloon, over 10 ft (3.05 m) high and measuring 98 ft (30 m) long by 63 ft (19.2 m) wide. Over the central part of this room was a well that rose through three decks to a skylight. It was done in a style described as "modified Italian style", with the a coffered ceiling in white and gold, supported by ionic pillars. The paneled walls were done in Spanish mahogany, inlaid with ivory and richly carved with pilasters and decorations.

== Early history ==
On 21 July 1900, she sank the British barque Embleton in a collision 30 miles (48 km) north east of the Tuskar Light in the Irish Channel.

== Wireless history ==
In 1901, her sister Lucania became the first Cunard liner to be fitted with a Marconi wireless system, followed a few months later by Campania.

Shortly after these installations, the two ships made history by exchanging the first wireless-transmitted ice bulletin. Campania earned one more distinction in the history of wireless communication in 1905, when she became the first liner to have permanent radio connection to coastal stations around the world. From that time on, a ship crossing the Atlantic would never be isolated from the rest of the world in the same way again.

== Final days ==
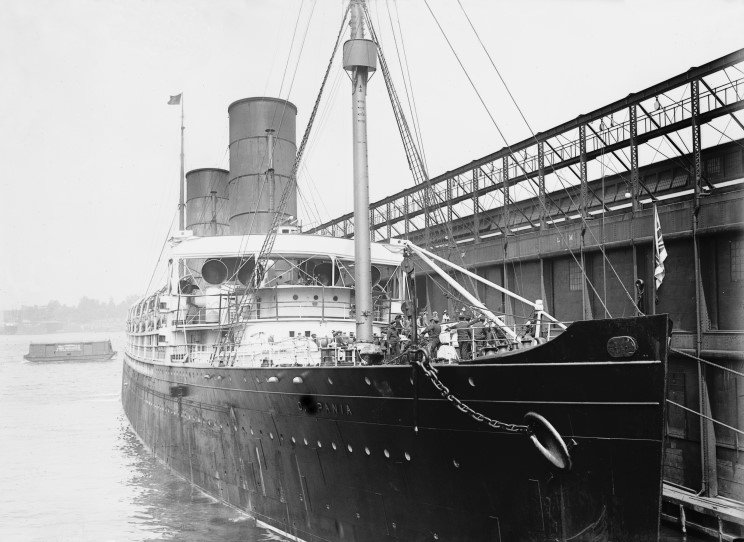
Campania at the Cunard Pier in New York.

Campania and Lucania served as Cunard's major passenger liners for 14 years, during which time they were superseded in both speed and size by a succession of four-funnelled German liners, starting with the Kaiser Wilhelm der Grosse in 1897, which sparked off a battle between nations to create the largest most powerful liners such as the Kaiser and Olympic-class ocean liners. The German competition necessitated the construction of replacements for the two Cunarders, which came to fruition in 1907 with the appearance of the RMS Lusitania and RMS Mauretania.

With the appearance of a third Cunard giant in 1914, RMS Aquitania, Campania was no longer required. Her last planned voyage for Cunard was her 250th, and commenced on 25 April 1914. On her return to Liverpool, she was chartered to the Anchor Line to do voyages from Glasgow to New York. However, the First World War broke out and Aquitania, having completed only three voyages, was immediately commandeered by the Navy and converted into a fully armed merchant cruiser. Campania was therefore recalled to take her place but unfortunately, she was too old and managed only three voyages before being sold for scrap. Her last voyage as a passenger liner was on 26 September 1914. However, Campania was to have a last-minute reprieve.

== HMS Campania ==
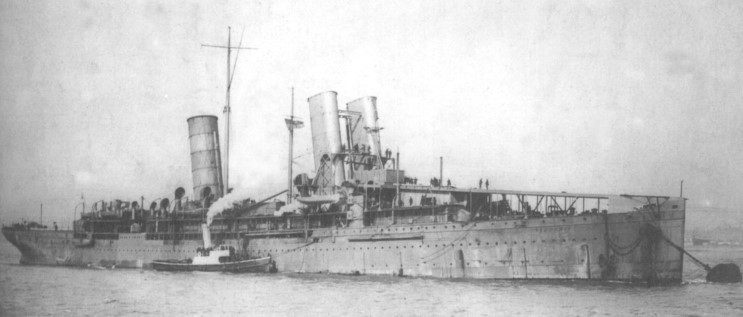
HMS Campania

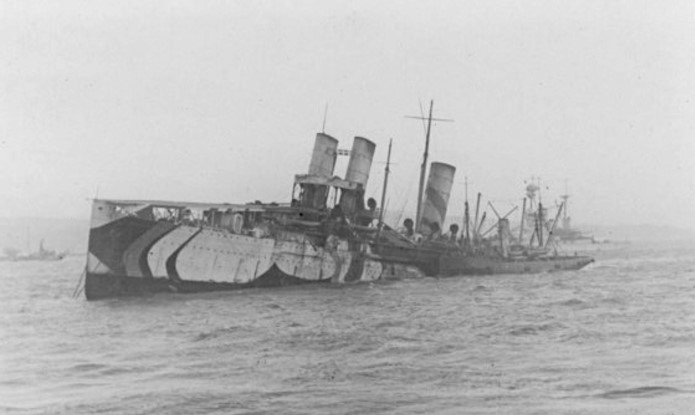
The sinking of Campania

While Campania awaited demolition, the Admiralty stepped in at the last minute and bought her with a view of converting her to an armed merchant cruiser that could carry seaplanes. The original idea was to use float-planes which would be lowered into and retrieved from the water by a crane. The conversion was carried out at the Cammell Laird shipyard in Birkenhead. Her interior was completely gutted, and room made inside to store up to 14 aircraft. She was also equipped with eight 4.7" (120-mm) guns.

The conversion was completed in 1915, and trials took place under Captain Oliver Schwann of the Royal Navy, with Charles H. Lightoller (formerly second officer of RMS Titanic) as the first officer. Two weeks later she joined the fleet at Scapa Flow as HMS Campania, and subsequently began manoeuvres in the North Sea. Her job was to send airplanes ahead to scout for the German fleet.

After a short period, it was decided to add 160 ft (49 m) flight deck at the front of the ship, to enable aircraft to take off directly from the ship without being lowered into the water. Trials following this conversion indicated that the deck was too short, so it was extended to 220 ft (67 m). The alterations required the removal of the forward part of the superstructure, and the first funnel (which was replaced by two narrower funnels on each side). The aft deck was cleared and the aft mast removed, so that she could also serve as an Observation Balloon Ship. Campania now bore little resemblance to her original configuration.

HMS Campania served with the Admiralty right up until 5 November 1918—just six days before the armistice was signed, when she was involved in an accident in the Firth of Forth during high winds. Campania dragged her anchor in a sudden squall, and at 03:45 struck the bow of the battleship Royal Oak and then dragged along the side of the battle cruiser Glorious. She began to sink stern first. A few hours later an explosion—presumed to be a boiler—sent her to the bottom.

Because of the shallowness of the water, she was considered a danger to shipping and large charges were placed on the decks to demolish her. By 1921, the wreck had been reduced to a safe clearance depth. Further to this destruction it is reported that salvage of valuable metals took place on the wreck, possibly during the late 1940s and the 1960s. Despite this damage, the wreck site today is located at 56°02′N 03°13′W and is classified as being of historical importance, being designated under the Protection of Wrecks Act in 2000. This designation was revoked in 2013 when the site was re-designated as a Historic Marine Protected Area under the Marine (Scotland) Act 2010.

Records
Preceded by City of New York	Blue Riband (Eastbound record); 1893–1894	Succeeded by Lucania
Preceded by City of Paris	Blue Riband (Westbound record); 1893–1894	Succeeded by Lucania
