= Titan Clydebank =

Cantilever crane at Clydebank, West Dunbartonshire, Scotland

Coordinates: 55.8973°N 4.4085°W

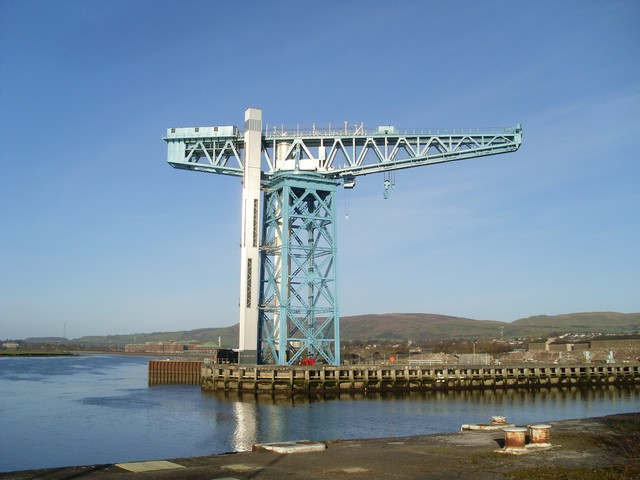
The refurbished Titan Crane at Clydebank, situated adjacent to the fitting-out basin of the former John Brown & Company shipyard.

Titan Clydebank, more commonly known as the Titan Crane is a 161-foot-high (49 m) cantilever crane at Clydebank, West Dunbartonshire, Scotland. It was designed to be used in the lifting of heavy equipment, such as engines and boilers, during the fitting-out of battleships and ocean liners at the John Brown & Company shipyard. It was also the world's first electrically powered cantilever crane, and the largest crane of its type at the time of its completion.

Situated at the end of a U-shaped fitting out basin, the crane was used to construct some of the largest ships of the 20th century, including the Queen Mary, Queen Elizabeth and Queen Elizabeth 2. The Category A Listed historical structure was refurbished in 2007 as a tourist attraction and shipbuilding museum. It is featured on the current Clydesdale Bank £5 note.

== History ==
The shipyard at Clydebank was created in 1871 after the company James & George Thomson moved from the Govan Graving Docks. John Brown & Company purchased the yard in 1899, and in 1905, a £24,600 order for the crane was placed with Dalmarnock based engineering company Sir William Arrol & Co. Titan was completed two years later in 1907. It was constructed by the Scottish engineer Adam Hunter (1869–1933), who was working as Chief Engineer for Arrol & Co., having served his apprenticeship on the construction of the Forth Bridge. Stothert & Pitt of Bath, England, fabricated and installed most of the machinery for the Titan, including electric motors built by Lancashire Dynamo and Motor Co.

The dock was used for fitting out new vessels, and the crane lifted engines and boilers into ships. The lifting capacity of the Titan, and the location of the yard at the confluence of the River Clyde and River Cart, contributed to the success of the yard as it could build extremely large ships.

When tested on 24 April 1907, Titan was the largest cantilever crane ever built with a capacity of 160 tonnes (160 long tons; 180 short tons) at a radius of 85 feet (26 m). The original lift capacity was uprated to 203 long tons (206 t) in 1938, when it became apparent that the original specification would be insufficient to install the new long range gun's turrets into ships such as the Duke of York.

On the nights of 13 and 14 March 1941, the Clydebank Blitz virtually destroyed the town. 528 civilians were killed, over 617 people were seriously injured, and 48,000 civilians lost their homes. Only seven properties in Clydebank were undamaged, in one of the worst bombing raids in Britain. The raids, involving 260 Luftwaffe bombers on the first night and 200 on the second, targeted the industry of Clydeside, but the Titan Crane was undamaged.

In 1968, the yard was amalgamated into Upper Clyde Shipbuilders along with four others, in an attempt to increase competitiveness. The general elections in 1970 saw a change of government, and funding for the yard was withheld, resulting in the closure of John Brown's. It was bought from the receivers by the Houston, Texas-based Marathon Manufacturing Company for oil rig construction. In 1980 Marathon sold the yard to the French company Union Industrielle et d’Entreprise (UiE). UIE's owners, Bouygues Offshore closed the yard in 2001 and the site was earmarked for redevelopment.

Ships constructed by the crane include HMS Hood, the Queen Mary, Queen Elizabeth, Queen Elizabeth 2, and the Royal Yacht Britannia.

=== Refurbishment ===
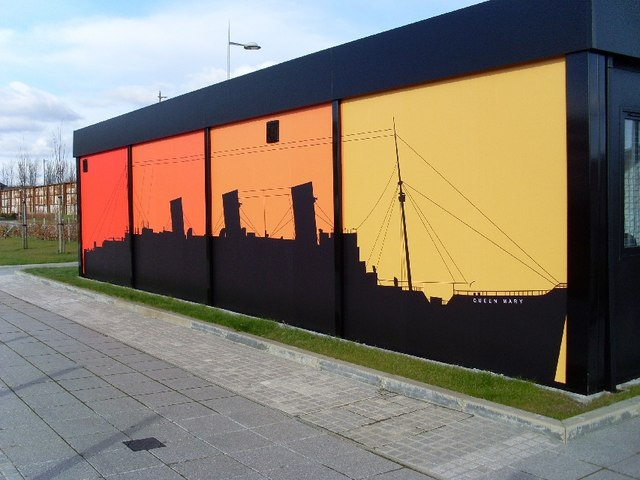
The ticket office (also known as the Pursers Office) and information centre at the Titan Crane, featuring a silhouette of the RMS Queen Mary.

The crane fell into disuse in 1980s, and in the intervening period of neglect, the crane suffered vandalism to the wheelhouse and corrosion to the structure. In 1988 the crane was recognised as a Category A Listed historical structure.

The urban regeneration company Clydebank Re-Built started a £3.75M restoration project in 2005, and the crane opened to the public in August 2007. The structure was shot-blasted to remove old paint and rust, allowing repairs to be undertaken before repainting. A lift for visitors to ascend to the jib and an emergency evacuation stair were installed, along with a wire mesh around the viewing area and floodlights to illuminate the crane at night.

In 2015, a bungee jump was added.

== Design ==
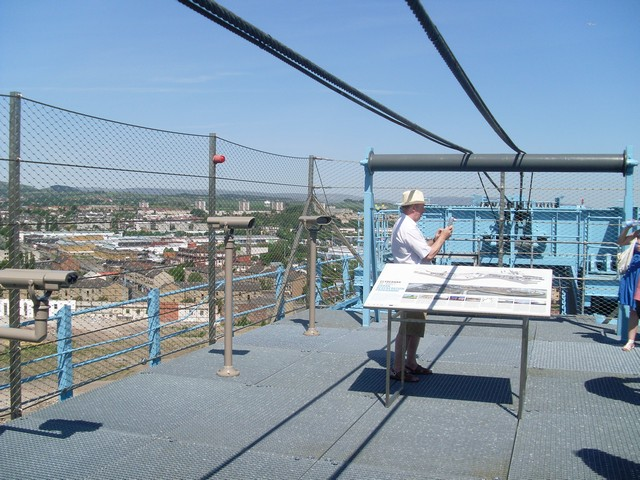
The Titan Crane's jib has been converted into a public viewing platform.

The Titan used a fixed counterweight and electrically operated hoists all mounted on a rotated beam, making it faster and more responsive than its steam-powered predecessors. For lifting smaller assemblies that did not require the full lifting capacity of 150 tonnes (170 short tons), a 30 tonnes (33 short tons) auxiliary hoist was used, as large loads were comparatively rare.

Titan is 49 metres (161 ft) high, weighs about 800 tonnes (790 long tons; 880 short tons) and sits on four concrete piles sunk to a depth of 23 metres (75 ft) deep. The arms of the cantilever are 45.7 metres (150 ft) and 27.4 metres (90 ft) long. The tower is 12 metres (39 ft) square, and its centre sits just 10.7 metres (35 ft) from the edge of the quay.

Following the removal of the Beardmore Crane in the 1970s and the Fairfield Titan in 2007, there are now four giant cantilever cranes on the River Clyde. The others are at Stobcross (Finnieston Crane), Scotstoun (Barclay Curle Crane) and Greenock (James Watt Dock Crane). Fewer than sixty giant cantilever cranes were built worldwide, six of them on the Clyde, and as of May 2011, it is believed only eleven remained, four of those on the Clyde.

== Awards ==
The crane was awarded the 2012 Engineering Heritage Award by the Institution of Mechanical Engineers, and described as "a magnificent example of mechanical engineering, which forms an integral part of the local landscape". Titan was designated as an International Historic Civil and Mechanical Engineering Landmark by the American Society of Civil Engineers and the American Society of Mechanical Engineers in 2013, the fifth such award given to a Scottish structure.

For the restoration of the structure, recognition was accorded by Chicago Athenaeum Award for Architecture in 2008 and by the Civic Trust in 2009.
