= ARA Santa Cruz =

Several ships of the Argentine Navy have been named ARA Santa Cruz (or Santa Cruz before the 1860s):

- Santa Cruz (1814), a schooner
- Santa Cruz (1876), a schooner purchased in 1876 and lost in 1880
- Rio Santa Cruz (1896), a steam transport purchased in 1896 and decommissioned in 1905
- ARA Santa Cruz (1921), a tanker launched in 1921, transferred to YPF, and scrapped in 1948
- ARA Santa Cruz (D-12), a Buenos Aires-class destroyer launched in 1938 and scrapped in 1973
- ARA Santa Cruz (S-41), a TR-1700-class submarine launched in 1982, currently in service with the Argentine Navy
