= Fairfield Shipbuilding and Engineering Company =

Scottish shipbuilding company

- Type: Public company
- Industry: Shipbuilding
- Predecessor: Randolph, Elliott and Co. Randolph, Elder and Co. John Elder & Co.
- Founded: 1834
- Defunct: 1968
- Fate: Merged with others to form Upper Clyde Shipbuilders
- Successor: Govan Shipbuilders
- Headquarters: Govan, Scotland, UK
- Key people: Charles Randolph; John Elder; Sir William Pearce; Sir James Lithgow; Sir Alexander Kennedy
- Products: Naval ships Merchant ships Ocean liners Marine engines
- Parent: Northumberland Shipbuilding Group (1919–1935); Lithgows (1935–1965)
- Subsidiaries: Fairfield Rowan (1961-1966); Chepstow Bridge and Constructional Works (1924-1966)

Fairfield Shipbuilding and Engineering Company, Limited was a Scottish shipbuilding company in the Govan area on the Clyde in Glasgow. Fairfields, as it was often known, was a major warship builder, turning out many vessels for the Royal Navy and other navies through the First World War and the Second World War. It also built many transatlantic liners, including record-breaking ships for the Cunard Line and Canadian Pacific, such as the Blue Riband-winning twin ocean liners, RMS Campania and RMS Lucania. At the other end of the scale, Fairfields built fast cross-channel mail steamers and ferries for locations around the world. These included ships for the Bosporus crossing in Istanbul and some of the early ships used by Thomas Cook for developing tourism on the River Nile.

== John Elder & Co and predecessors ==
=== Millwright Randolph & Elliott ===
Charles Randolph founded the company as Randolph & Co. With prior experience, Randolph had been an apprentice at the Clyde shipyard of Robert Napier, and at William Fairbairn & Sons in Manchester. With the knowledge that he acquired, he started as a millwright in partnership with his cousin Richard S. Cunliff, who managed the commercial side. By 1834 it built engines and machinery in the Tradeston district of Glasgow. It was the first serious local manufacturer of cog and other large wheels for driving machinery, and soon became famous for accuracy.

In 1839, John Elliott joined the firm and it became known as Randolph, Elliott & Co. Elliott died shortly after becoming a partner.

=== Randolph, Elder and Co. builds ship engines ===
In 1852, the company became Randolph, Elder and Company when John Elder (1824–1869) joined the business. Elder had a natural talent for engineering and had previously worked at the Napier shipyard. It enabled the company to start diversifying into marine engineering. In this field, the company would acquire world fame. Its skills in this field enabled it to become one of the biggest shipbuilders in the world. The story is closely connected to the application of the compound steam engine for marine use, in which the firm played a crucial role. With regard to the compound engine two specific phases can be discerned: "low" pressure compound engines and "high" pressure compound engines.

The compound engine with low-pressure would give Randolph, Elder and Co. its first renown for economical compound machinery. The company's attempts centred on trying to prevent energy loss due to friction and premature condensation of steam. In July 1854 the screw steamer Brandon was fit with engines by Randolph, Elder & Co. It had a vertical geared compound engine with a patented (January 1853) arrangement of the cylinders. The crankshaft was turned by two opposite cranks (arms). One was driven by the high-pressure cylinder, the other by the low-pressure cylinder, with the pistons always moving in opposite directions. Brandon, a vessel of about 800 tons and 800 ihp made her trials in July 1854. She had a coal consumption of about 3.25 lbs per ihp per hour. At the time the lowest rate of consumption in other steamers was about 4 to 4.5 lbs per ihp per hour. The merits of the engine of Brandon were not enough to persuade others, and from 1854 till about 1866 Randolph, Elder and Co were the only engineers who made compound engines under their various patents.

The Pacific Steam Navigation Company became an enthusiastic customer. Between 1855–1856, it operated on the west coast of South America. In that area, fuel was imported from Britain and therefore more costly. When the Crimean War broke out, freight tariffs increased to the point that the price of coal almost doubled there. The directors then conferred with the company, resulting in the 'double-cylinder engine'. Inca and Valparaiso were paddle-steamers which got this engine, that got patented in March 1856. Construction of that for Inca was started in May 1856. It had two pairs of cylinders, lying so their piston rods were at a 60 to 90 degree angle. Each pair consisted of a high- and low-pressure cylinder lying next to each other, so they could easily exchange steam. Their pistons moved in opposite directions and drove one crank, which was attached to the crankshaft opposite the crank of the other pair. This gave the optimal balance of driving forces that could be attained for this number of cylinders. Furthermore, the cylinders were 'jacketed' at the top and bottom. The jacket heated the cylinder from the outside to prevent condensation in the cylinder. It had been invented by James Watt, but the company was the first to re-apply it, probably because it first understood its purpose. The company then supplied more double-cylinder engines, but with the cylinders completely jacketed. Admiral by Robert Napier, made her trial in June 1858. Another ship with the same engine was Callao built by John Reid in 1858. On trials fuel consumption for these ships was: Inca 2.5 lbs/ihp/h, Callao 2.7 lbs/ihp/h, Valparaiso and Admiral 3 lbs/ihp/h. It amounted to a saving of 30-40 per cent, and this was maintained later on. It made it possible to continue steam navigation on the Pacific Ocean with profit. In fact, in 1858 the Pacific Steam Navigation Company had 7 to 8 years old oftraditional machinery removed from three of her large steamers, and replaced by compound engines. It saved 40% in fuel and 30 feet of space amidships because less space was needed for coal.

From 1854 to 1866 Randolph, Elder & Co. constructed 18 sets of paddle engines and 30 sets of screw compound engines. A significant project included the conversion of the frigate HMS Constance to steam propulsion in 1863, and her race against two frigates with engines by John Penn and Sons and Maudslay, Sons and Field. In 1860 the company started to use surface condensation instead of the jet condenser. In 1862, it increased steam pressure to 40 lbs per square inch.

=== Starts to build ships ===
In 1858 the company acquired the Govan Old Shipyard, and diversified into shipbuilding. The first ship was built in 1861 as No 14. Macgregor Laird was built for the African Steamship Company. Other ships followed, and the business moved to a new yard at the former Fairfield Farm at the Govan riverside in 1864. From 1861 to 1866, roughly 59 ships were built.

The general breakthrough of the compound engine was not affected by Randolph, Elder & Co., but by Alfred Holt. Holt succeeded in getting the Board of Trade to lift the ban on boilers with a pressure higher than 25 lbs per square inch (psi). The use of high-pressure steam made the compound engine far more effective, and Randolph, Elder & Co. quickly adjusted. It allowed the construction of a far simpler two-cylinder compound engine that was even more effective than the low-pressure compound steam engine. In 1868 Charles Randolph retired from the firm, and John Elder became sole partner.

=== Vast expansion as John Elder & Co ===
The company became known as John Elder & Co in 1869. When John Elder died in September 1869 his wife ran the business for some time and renamed it in his honour. In 1869 she sold the company to a new partnership consisting of her brother John Francis Ure (1820–1883), J.L.K. Jamieson (1826–1883) and Sir William Pearce. It kept the name John Elder & Co. William Pearce became sole partner in 1878.

Starting from 1870, the company's new owners continued the expansion of the shipyard. Important customers between 1861 to 1875 were: the Pacific Steam Navigation Company for 40 vessels at 2,500,000 GBP, the African Mail Company and British and African Steam Navigation Company for 16 vessels at 500,000 GBP and Stoomvaart Maatschappij Nederland for 8 vessels at 600,000 GBP. Some qualitative notes further explain the leading position of the company at the time. In 1870 it launched Italy, a vessel of 400 feet, 4,200 tons gross measurement and 600 nominal hp. The largest vessel then afloat except for Great Eastern. In 1870-1871 it built two steamers for the London to Aberdeen line: City of London and Ban Righ were about 20% faster than their predecessors, while their fuel consumption was less than half of theirs. In 1871 Tagus and Moselle were launched for the Royal Mail Company's West India and Brazil trade. Both big steamers almost reached 15 knots on their trials. In 1873, it launched Iberia of 4,820 tons and 650 hp, the second largest merchant steamer then afloat. In 1871 HMS Hydra was launched with engines by John Elder.

== Fairfield Shipbuilding and Engineering Company and successors ==
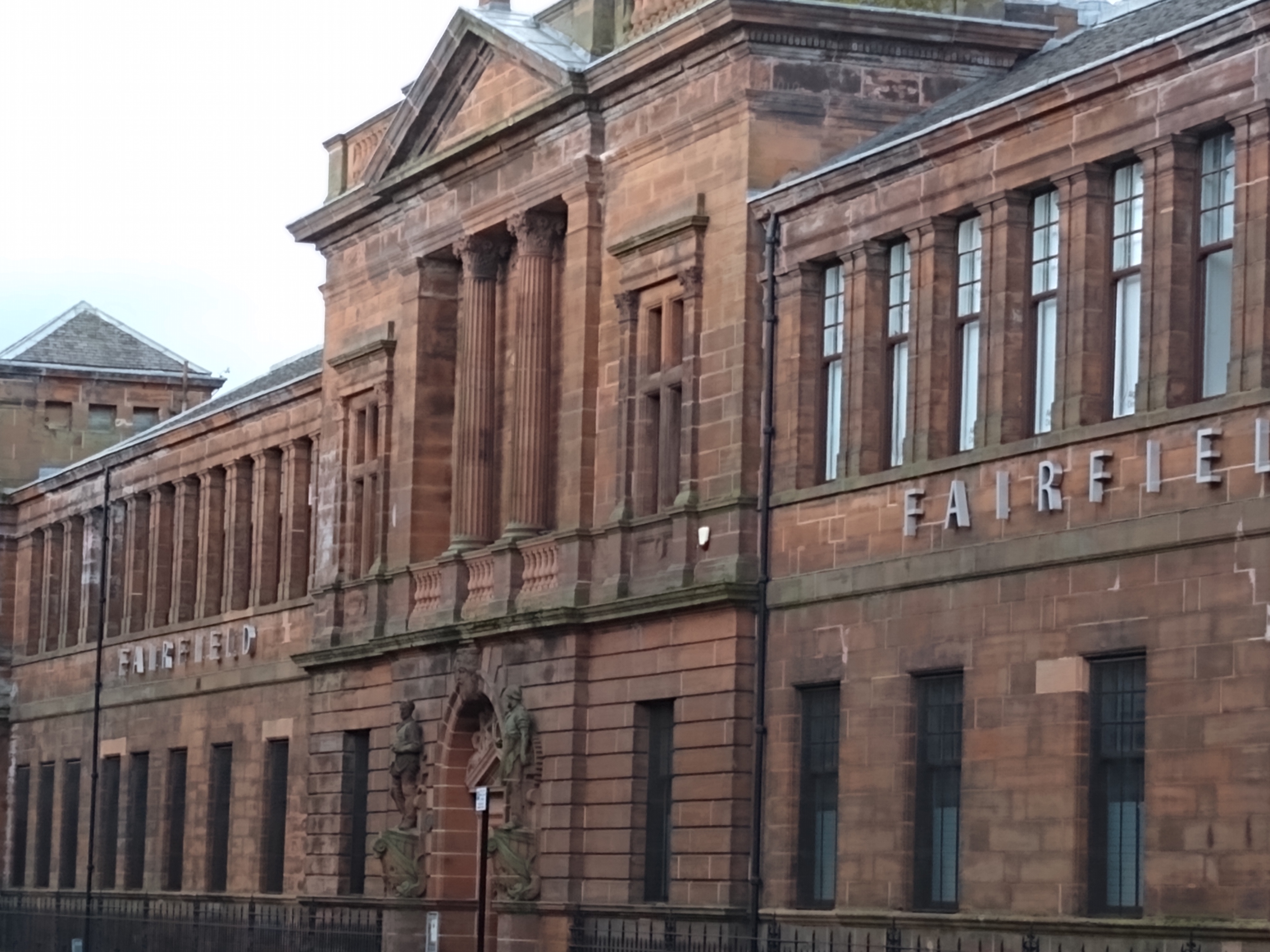
The imposing red sandstone offices of the Fairfield Shipbuilding and Engineering Company on Govan Road, which from 2013, has formed the Fairfield Heritage Centre.

In 1886 William Pearce converted the firm to a limited company, the Fairfield Shipbuilding & Engineering Co. This also entailed a simultaneous name change to Fairfield Shipbuilding and Engineering Company, after the old farm. The area of the farm itself was purchased by Isabella Elder in 1885 and donated to the people of Govan as Elder Park, dedicated to her late husband.

The shipyard's imposing red sandstone Drawing Offices were designed by John Keppie of Honeyman and Keppie, with help from a young Charles Rennie Mackintosh, and built 1889–91. The sculpted figures flanking the entrance are by James Pittendrigh Macgillivray.

John Carmichael was manager of the Fairfield yard in 1894. He was born in Govan in 1858 and had entered Fairfield as an apprentice in 1873. When his apprenticeship was completed seven years later, Sir William Pearce made him head draughtsman, and later he was promoted to assistant manager.

In February 1897 a major fire broke out in the yard. The fire spread rapidly and within ten minutes the vast majority of the buildings, covering several acres, were ablaze with the joiner's, pattern, and fitting shops totally destroyed. Various ships under construction were threatened, amongst which were HMS Argonaut and RMS Empress Queen. The vessels were however separated from the buildings and no significant damage was sustained. The cost of the damage was estimated at £40,000 and caused 4,000 workmen to be thrown idle.

Alexander Cleghorn FRSE became the Fairfield manager in 1909. The company also established the Coventry Ordnance Works joint venture with Yarrow Shipbuilders and others in 1905. Sir Alexander Gracie, who was born in Dunvegan, worked at various other Clydeside shipbuilders before he started at Fairfield in 1896, where amongst other things he worked with Jack Fisher to develop the Invincible class for the Royal Navy, including the Indomitable, which was built at Fairfield. In 1909 Sir Alexander became chairman and managing director of the company, posts he held for a decade. Fisher described him as Britain's greatest naval architect. He died in 1933. Dorothy Rowntree, the first woman in UK to qualify in naval architecture and to graduate in engineering from the University of Glasgow worked for the company between 1926 and 1928.

The Fairfield Titan was built for the yard in 1911 by Sir William Arrol & Co., with a maximum lift capacity of 200 tons. It was acknowledged for many years as the largest crane in the world. It was employed in lifting the engines and boilers aboard ships in the fitting-out basin. The crane was a Category B listed building, but it was demolished in 2007 during yard modernisation works.

=== Subsidiary of Northumberland Shipbuilding Company ===
In 1919 the company became part of the Northumberland Shipbuilding Company, with Alexander Kennedy installed as managing director. In 1921 Alexander Kennedy was knighted. Sir Alexander became Fairfield chairman in 1930 and remained so until 1937.

The Fairfield West Yard was added at the outbreak of the First World War for submarine construction, but closed after ten years due to severe recession and was demolished by National Shipbuilders Securities in 1934. The Fairfield West yard site was eventually used by the United States Army Corps of Engineers in 1944 to build four landing craft.

In 1924, the company bought a shipyard at Chepstow on the River Wye in South Wales, previously developed as National Shipyard No.1 in the First World War and then taken over by the Monmouthshire Shipbuilding Company. The works later specialised in assembling bridges and other major structures.

=== Subsidiary of Lithgows ===
In 1935, Fairfield was taken over by Lithgows of Port Glasgow after it had become entangled with the insolvency of the Anchor Line.

In the 1950s, the yard underwent a major 4 million pound modernisation programme which was implemented slowly over a period of ten years to minimise disruption to the yard. In 1963, the Fairfield engine building division merged with another Lithgow subsidiary, David Rowan & Company, to form Fairfield Rowan Ltd. Soon after the decade-long shipyard modernisation works were completed, Fairfield Shipbuilding and Engineering Ltd and Fairfield Rowan Ltd were placed into receivership and was subsequently sold by Lithgow's in 1965. Fairfield's Chepstow works was sold to the Mabey Group in 1966. The marine engine-building subsidiary Fairfield Rowan was closed in 1966.

=== Fairfield (Glasgow) Ltd ===
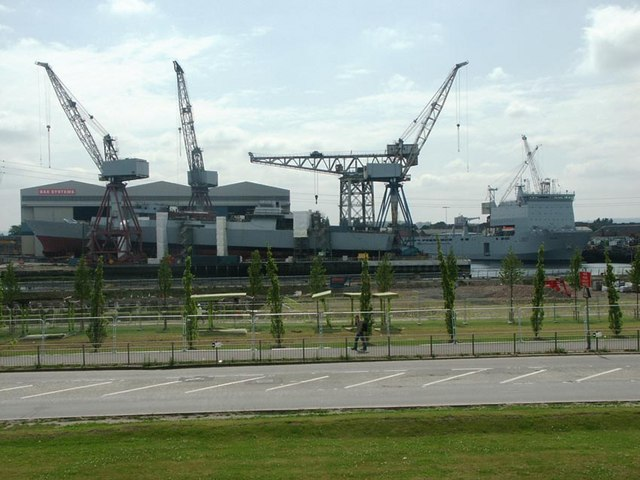
The former Fairfield shipyard continues in operation as part of BAE Systems Surface Ships.

The recently modernised shipbuilding operation was reconstituted as Fairfield (Glasgow) Ltd in 1966, under its founding chairman and industrialist Sir Iain Maxwell Stewart who was also chairman of Thermotank Ltd. It became known as the famous Fairfield Experiment, into new ways of improving productivity through new reforms to industrial relations and the application of scientific management methods to improve productivity. The era of the Fairfield experiment was captured by Sean Connery in his documentary The Bowler and the Bunnet.

=== Further decline and nationalization ===
In 1968 the company was made part of Upper Clyde Shipbuilders, which collapsed in 1971 when a strike and work-in received national press attention. As part of the recovery deal, Fairfields was formed into Govan Shipbuilders in 1972, which was itself later nationalised and subsumed into British Shipbuilders in 1977.

=== The shipyard as part of BAE ===
On the break-up of British Shipbuilders under denationalisation in 1988, the former Fairfield yard was sold to the Norwegian Kværner group and renamed Kvaerner Govan. The yard passed to BAE Systems Marine in 1999 and is now part of BAE Systems Surface Ships.

== Ships built ==
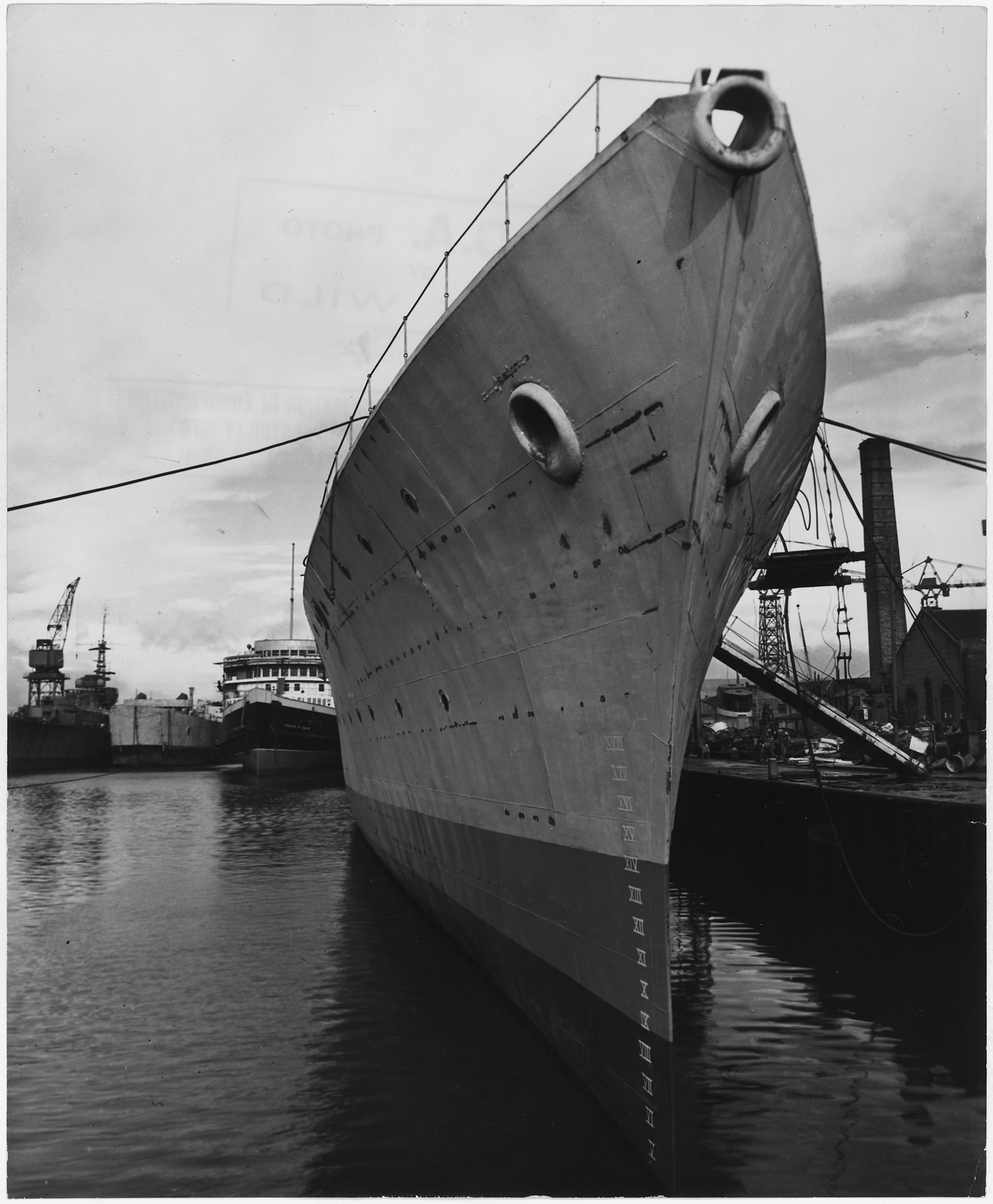
HMS Delight, a Daring-class Destroyer launched at Fairfield in 1950, was the Royal Navy's first all-welded warship.

Some of the better-known ships built by Fairfield's include:

Two of three ships that were lost in the action of 22 September 1914 were built at Fairfield's. These ships alongside HMS Hogue were the first vessels ever to be sunk by a German U-boat (SM U-9).

HMS Cressy

HMS Aboukir

- Battlecruisers:
  - HMS Indomitable
  - HMS New Zealand
  - HMS Renown
- Battleships:
  - HMS Commonwealth
  - HMS Valiant
  - HMS Howe
  - HMS Curacoa
- Cruisers:
  - HMS Liverpool
  - Norfolk
- Destroyers:
  - HMS Cameleon
  - HMS Comet
  - HMS Goldfinch
  - HMS Maori
- Torpedo boat destroyers:
  - HMAS Parramatta
- Submarines
  - HMS K13
  - HMS K14
  - HMS L15
  - HMS L16
  - HMS L55
  - HMS L56
- Aircraft carriers:
  - HMS Implacable
  - HMS Theseus
- Passenger ships:
  - SS Assiniboia
  - SS Arizona (John Elder & Co.)
  - Athenia
  - RMS Caledonia (1948)
  - SS Campania
  - PS Cardiff Queen
  - Cheshire
  - RMS Cilicia
  - RMS Circassia
  - RMS Empress of Britain (1905)
  - RMS Empress of Ireland
  - RMS Empress Queen
  - SS Keewatin
  - SS Koning der Nederlanden (John Elder & Co.)
  - SS Leicestershire
  - RMS Lucania
  - SS Montrose
  - RMS Orontes
  - SS Prins Hendrik I (John Elder & Co.)
  - SS Prins Hendrik II (John Elder & Co.)
  - SS Prins van Oranje II (John Elder & Co.)
  - SS Stirling Castle (John Elder & Co.)
  - SS Volturno
  - TEV Wahine
  - SS Willem III (John Elder & Co.)
  - MS Worcestershire
- Passenger steam ships for Şehir Hatları (Turkish Maritime Lines):
  - S/S Tarzi Nevin (Bosphorus No.47)
  - S/S Dilnisin (Bosphorus No.48)
  - P/S Hale (Bosphorus No.49)
  - P/S Seyyale (Bosphorus No.50)
  - S/S Sureyya (Bosphorus No.51)
  - S/S Sihap (Bosphorus No.52)
  - S/S Tarabya (Bosphorus No.57)
  - S/S Nimet (Bosphorus No.58)
  - S/S Sarayburnu (Bosphorus No.65)
  - S/S Bogazici (Bosphorus No.66)
  - S/S Halas (Bosphorus No.71)
  - S/S Altinkum (Bosphorus No.74)
  - S/S Kuzguncuk (Yard No:802)
  - S/S Kanlıca (Yard No:803)
  - S/S Pendik (Yard No:804)
  - S/S Anadolu Kavağı (Yard No:805)
  - S/S Ataköy (Yard No:806)
  - S/S İnkılap (Yard No:807)
  - S/S Harbiye (Yard No:808)
  - S/S Teğmen Ali İhsan Kalmaz (Yard No:809)
  - S/S Turan Emeksiz (Yard No:810)
- Private Steam Yachts:
- SY Atmah for Baron Edmond Rothschild
- Clyde paddle steamers:
  - PS Jeanie Deans
  - PS Jupiter
  - PS Juno
  - PS Marchioness of Lorne
- Union Castle Line – RMS Gloucester Castle launched 13 May 1911 requisitioned as HMHS Gloucester Castle 31 March 1917
- Tankers
  - ARA Santa Cruz
- Icebreaker
  - CGS Stanley

== See also ==
- Ocean liners for Canadian Pacific Steamships:
  - RMS Empress of Britain
  - RMS Empress of Ireland
  - RMS Empress of Asia
  - RMS Empress of Russia
  - RMS Empress of Canada
  - RMS Empress of Japan
- John Elder F.C. (works association football side which competed in the Scottish Cup from 1877 to 1882)
