= Finnieston Crane =

Disused giant cantilever crane

Coordinates: 55.85782°N 4.28620°W

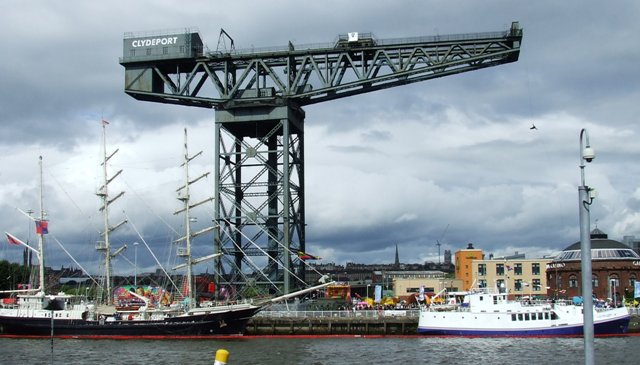
The Finnieston Crane with a soldier abseiling from the tip

The Finnieston Crane or Stobcross Crane is a disused giant cantilever crane in the centre of Glasgow, Scotland. It is no longer operational, but is retained as a symbol of the city's engineering heritage. The crane was used for loading cargo, in particular steam locomotives, onto ships to be exported around the world.

It is one of four such cranes on the River Clyde, a fifth one having been demolished in 2007, and one of only eleven giant cantilever cranes remaining worldwide.

== History ==
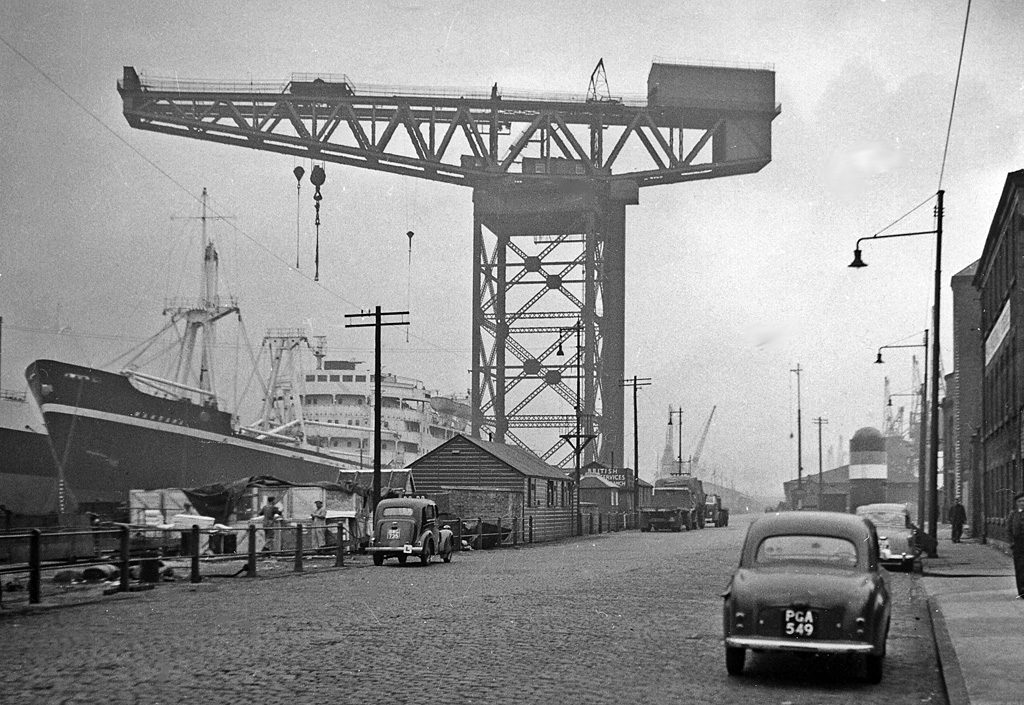
The crane in September 1957

=== Earlier cranes ===
The first crane to be called 'Finnieston Crane' was moved from a site opposite York Street to Finnieston Quay in 1848. It was tested with a load of 30 tons of pig-iron and ready for use at the end of April of that year. A newspaper report mentions the crane would be entirely used for lifting machinery on board steam-vessels.

Queens Dock was opened in August 1877 as a 61-acre (25 ha) dock for exporting goods from the centre of Glasgow. A 130-tonne (130-long-ton; 140-short-ton) steam crane was constructed west of the current one in the 1890s, until it was demolished to make way for a proposed bridge crossing between Finnieston Quay and Mavisbank Quay that was never built.

=== The present Finnieston crane ===
The present crane, constructed as a replacement, was the last giant cantilever crane to be built on the Clyde. It was commissioned in June 1928 by the Clyde Navigation Trust, the operators of the port and dock facilities in Glasgow, completed in 1931 and commenced operation in 1932. The tower was built by Cowans, Sheldon & Company of Carlisle and the cantilever by the Cleveland Bridge & Engineering Company, under the supervision of Daniel Fife, mechanical engineer to the Clyde Navigation Trust. The contract to build the crane did not go to Sir William Arrol & Co., who had significant experience in dock cranes, and built a number of other cranes along the Clyde including the Titan Clydebank, although Arrol was involved in the design of the foundations.

The total cost of the crane and foundations was £69,000, 85% of which was met by the Trust. It is properly known as the "Stobcross Crane" or "Clyde Navigation Trustees crane #7", but its proximity to Finnieston Quay, and the fact that it was intended to replace the previous Finnieston Crane, has led to its being popularly known as the Finnieston Crane.

== Public artwork ==
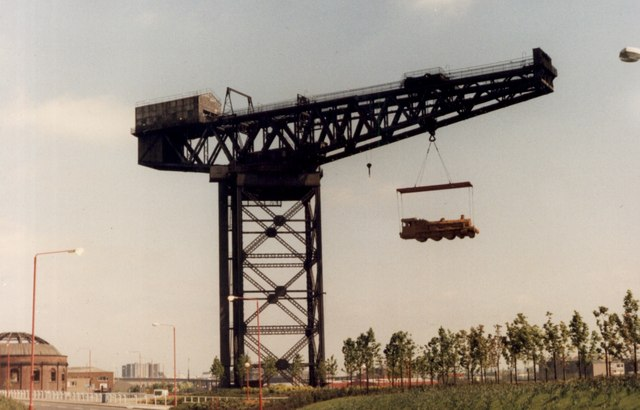
The Finnieston Crane in 1987 holding the straw locomotive sculpted by George Wyllie

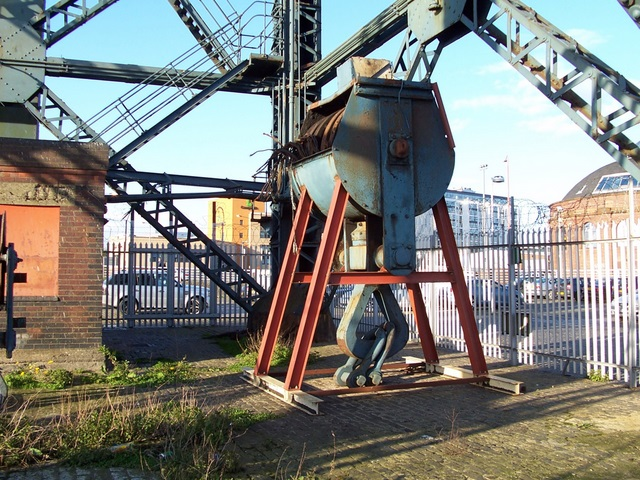
One of the hook blocks stored under the crane

Commissioned as part of the TSWA 3D exhibition, and displayed during Glasgow's 1987 Mayfest arts festival, a full-size replica locomotive made from straw by local sculptor George Wyllie was hauled from the old Hyde Park Works in Springburn and suspended from the crane, then hauled back to Springburn and burned to reveal the metal framework underneath.

After Wyllie's death in May 2012, a giant question mark was suspended from the crane in an acknowledgement of his work. In 2013, microphones were attached to the crane by American artist Bill Fontana, to record the sounds made by the structure.

An art sculpture entitled “The Glasgow Rose”, inspired by Charles Rennie Mackintosh was suspended from the crane throughout Glasgow’s hosting of the 2026 Commonwealth Games.

== Purpose ==
Connected to a spur of the Stobcross Railway, the crane's primary purpose was the lifting of heavy machinery, such as tanks and steam locomotives, onto ships for export. As many as 30,000 locomotives were hauled through the streets of Glasgow by Clydesdale horses, traction engines and diesel tractors, from the works at Springburn to the crane for export to the British Empire. The crane is (as of 1988) not in working order, but is retained as a symbol of the city's engineering heritage.

== Design ==
The Finnieston Crane is a giant cantilever crane, 53 metres (175 ft) tall with a 46-metre (152 ft) cantilever jib. It has a lifting capacity of 175 tons, and could perform a full rotation in three and a half minutes. It can be ascended either by a steel staircase or an electric lift, the only example of such a personnel lift in Britain. It is also the only crane fitted with a horizontal rail to permit movement of the jigger hoist, an auxiliary crane intended to handle lighter loads.

The docks serviced by the crane were closed in 1969, and have since been filled in and redeveloped. The North Rotunda (part of the defunct Clyde Harbour Tunnel) stands to the east of the crane, and the Scottish Exhibition and Conference Centre and the Clyde Auditorium to the west.

It is one of four such cranes on the Clyde, after the Fairfield Titan was demolished in 2007, and one of only eleven giant cantilever cranes remaining worldwide. The crane can be seen in the background of Reporting Scotland broadcasts from BBC Pacific Quay and also in the backdrop of Live at Five on STV 2.

== Cultural references ==
The Finnieston Crane is the subject of a sketch in Limmy's Show!, a Scottish anti-humour sketch show broadcast on BBC Two Scotland, written and directed by Brian "Limmy" Limond. In character as Dee Dee, a zoned-out Glaswegian waster with a loose grip on reality, he recalls a dream he had that he can't be sure happened or not, where he had a party at the top of the 'Finneston Cran' with his father and sister.

"It was me, ma Sister and ma Da, and we wur huvin' a party. But somehow we wur huvin' it up the top a' that Finnieston Cran. That's whut makes me 'hink it nevur happened 'cuz that canny be done." - Dee Dee, Limmy's Show
