= SS Stirling Castle =

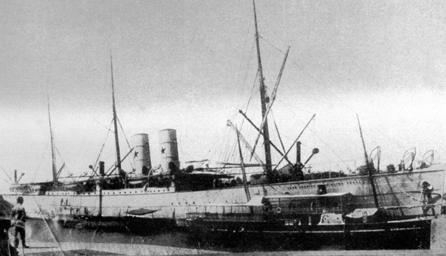
- SS Stirling Castle/ SS Nord America

History
- Name: SS Stirling Castle; SS Nord America
- Builder: J.Elder & Co, Glasgow
- Launched: 1882
- In service: 1882
- Out of service: 1910
- Fate: Scrapped, 1911

General characteristics
- Tonnage: 4,826 GRT2,951 NRT
- Length: 418 ft 7 in (127.58 m)
- Beam: 50 ft (15 m)
- Speed: 16.5 knots (30.6 km/h; 19.0 mph)

SS Stirling Castle was built by J.Elder & Co in Glasgow in 1882 and entered service with Thomas Skinner & Co., London in the tea trade from China. At 418.6 ft with a 50 ft beam, she measured 4,826 tons gross and 2,951 tons nett. She had a compound engine of 1500 horsepower and boilers which operated at 100 pounds per square inch (690 kPa).

On trials, she achieved 18.41 knots (34.10 km/h; 21.19 mph) and, in 1883, on a racing homeward passage loaded with tea, achieved an average speed of 16.5 knots (30.6 km/h; 19.0 mph). She held a long-standing record from the Tungshu Lightship to London with a time of 27 days and 4 hours. (Note: For comparison, the fastest service between Singapore and Europe in the early 1950s was one day less than this record-breaking run of 1883 from Wusong, China.) The cost of this was a very large coal consumption, variously reported at 150 and 180 tons per day. Her normal complement of firemen was 52, but on her record-breaking run she used 111 firemen – an indication of the massive amount of coal that was shovelled into the 36 furnaces that heated her boilers. Despite the higher freights (Note: Reported as £8 per ton on the record-breaking voyage. This compares with £6 per ton on her maiden voyage in 1882, a rate that was £2 higher than achieved by any others that year.) that she could achieve with this speed, she was uneconomic to operate and was sold later in 1883.

Her new owner was an Italian company, La Veloce and she was re-fitted with accommodation for passengers and renamed SS Nord America. She also kept the name SS Stirling Castle.

Her first voyage from Genoa to South America under Italian flag began on 13 November 1883. In 1884, she was named SS Nord America only.

She was chartered by the British government in 1885 to carry troops to Suakin, Sudan.

The ship departed from Genoa with Italian immigrants bound for Buenos Aires (arriving on July 13, 1887).

in 1899 the Russian government chartered her to carry troops between Odessa and Vladivostok in connection with the Boxer Rebellion.

In 1900, she was refitted by Palmers Shipbuilding and Iron Company and her engines were replaced, reducing her speed to only 13.5 knots.

Between 5 May 1901 and 25 March 1908, she made 58 round trips between Palermo, Naples and New York.

Beginning in 1909, she was used solely as a cargo steamer, and on 5 December 1910 carrying a shipment of horses from Buenos Aires, she ran aground off Morocco. She was re-floated and towed to Genoa, laid up and scrapped in 1911.

== Bibliography ==
- Bonsor, N.R.P. North Atlantic Seaway, vol.3. pp. 1264–1271.
- Bonsor, N.R.P. South Atlantic Seaway. pp. 278–279.
