= Beardmore Crane =

Coordinates: 55.90669°N 4.43144°W

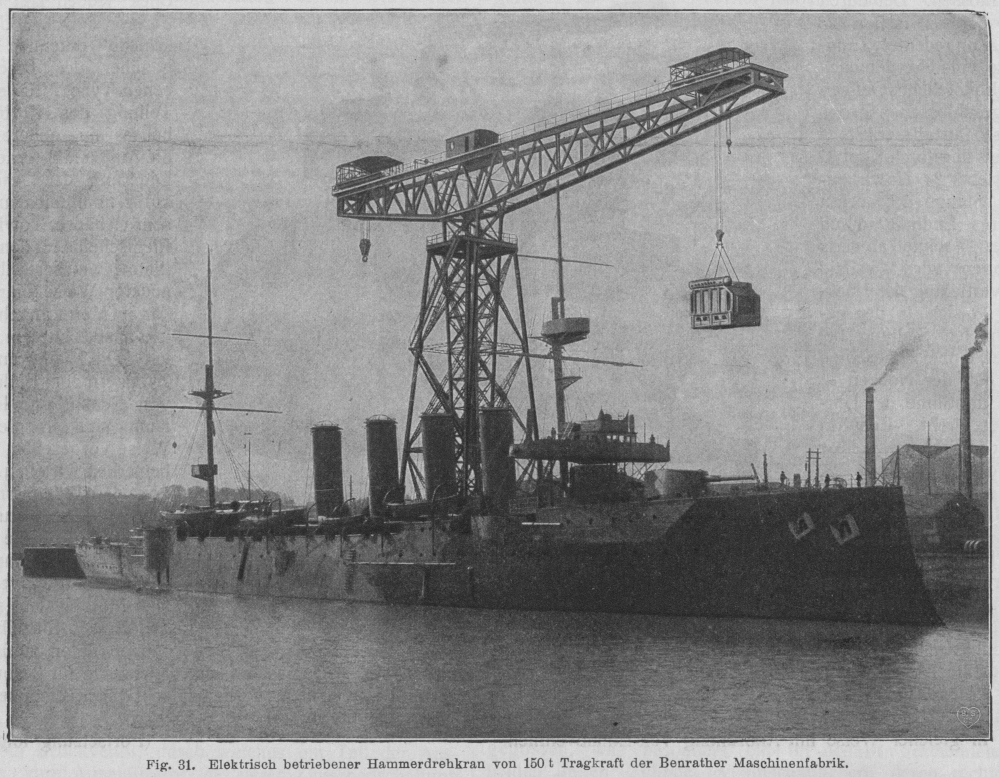
Using the long arm to lift a load onto a ship

The Beardmore Crane was a giant cantilever crane at the William Beardmore and Company yard.

== Design ==
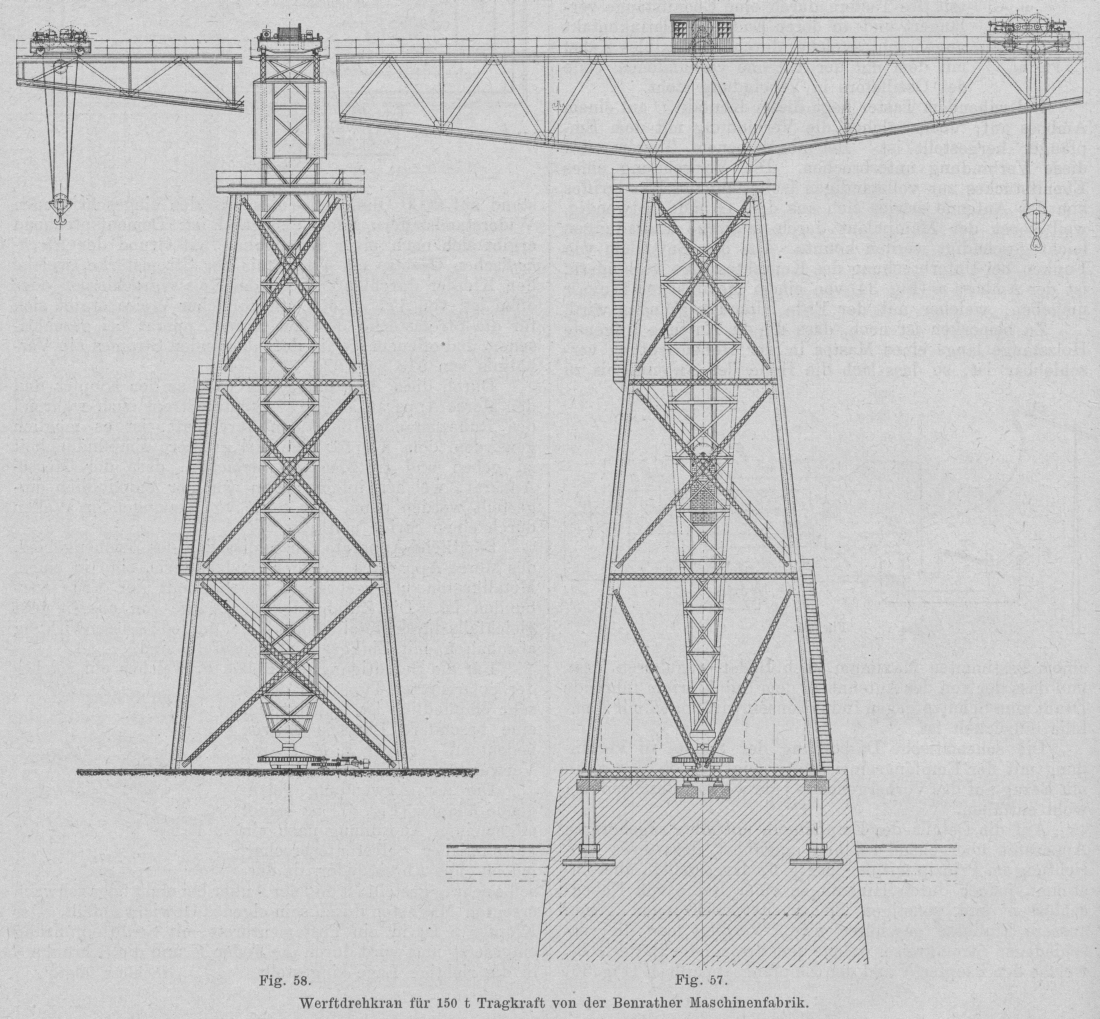
Plan of the crane

The Beardmore Crane had two opposite cantilevered jibs, both equipped with moving winches, for a total length of 233 feet (71 m). From the jib to the ground extended a tapering lattice, which was enclosed by a lattice tower. The jib was slewed by a mechanism on the ground, and bearings at the top of the tower and where the extension met the ground allowed it to turn. The winch on each arm was powered by two 52 horsepower (39 kW) electric motors for hoisting and two 14 horsepower (10 kW) motors for slewing, and a 18 horsepower (13 kW) motor for slewing. The tower took eight minutes to make a full revolution.

The height of the rail on which the winches ran was 154 feet (47 m), and communication with the operator was by speaking tube. The total weight of the structure was over 500 tonnes (490 long tons; 550 short tons). Upon completion, the shorter arm was tested to lift 200 tonnes (200 long tons; 220 short tons) at a radius of 72 feet 2 inches (22.00 m) and the longer arm could lift 50 tonnes (49 long tons; 55 short tons) at a radius of 139 feet 5 inches (42.49 m).

Railway tracks running beneath the crane allowed material to be moved from the workshops.

It was used for fitting out ships, installing very heavy items such as boilers, armour and guns. The basin it served was the largest in the world at the time of its completion.

== History ==
The crane was built by Benrather Maschinenfabrik near Düsseldorf, now Demag, and is similar to a crane built for Vickers in Barrow-in-Furness. The two cranes were the first modern high capacity cranes in Britain. Other shipbuilders installed massive cranes soon after, such as the Titan Clydebank in 1907, although these were typically British-built and of a different design.

The crane was erected in 1903 at a cost of £3,352 by German firm Kohncke. The yard was short-lived, lasting from 1899 to 1930, but saw significant use during the First World War when it built a number of ships for the Royal Navy.

The Beardmore Crane was demolished c. 1971.
