= HMS Hogue =

Three ships of the Royal Navy have been named HMS Hogue, after the battle of La Hogue, May 1692:

- HMS La Hogue (1811), third-rate sail, converted to unarmoured screw vessel 1849, broken up 1865
- HMS Hogue (1900), launched 1900, was a Cressy-class armoured cruiser, sunk in 1914.
- HMS Hogue (D74), launched 1944, was a Battle-class destroyer, scrapped in 1962.
