= ARA Santa Cruz (1921) =

History

Argentina
- Name: Santa Cruz
- Namesake: Santa Cruz province, Argentina
- Ordered: 1920
- Builder: Fairfield Shipbuilding & Engineering, Govan, Glasgow
- Launched: 22 June 1921
- Completed: 1921
- Commissioned: 1922
- Stricken: 1948
- Fate: Scrapped 1948
- Notes: Transferred to YPF after arrival in Argentina

General characteristics
- Type: Tanker
- Displacement: 5,700 tons
- Length: 110.94 m (364.0 ft)
- Beam: 1,432 m (4,698.2 ft)
- Draft: 8.6 m (28 ft)
- Propulsion: 1-shaft, 1 × marine steam engine
- Speed: 12 knots (14 mph; 22 km/h)
- Range: 9,900 miles
- Armament: none
- Notes: Career and characteristics data from "Histarmar" and "Flota YPF" websites.

ARA Santa Cruz was an auxiliary ship of the Argentine Navy, built in the Fairfield Shipbuilding & Engineering Shipyard, Govan, Scotland, in 1921. She was transferred to the YPF tanker fleet after arrival in Argentina, and remained in YPF service until decommissioned and scrapped in 1948. The vessel was named after the Argentine province of Santa Cruz, and is the ninth Argentine naval ship with this name.

== Design ==
Santa Cruz was a tanker built in 1921 at the Fairfield Shipbuilding and Engineering Company in Govan, Scotland. This ship featured a metal hull and superstructure, which included two masts and a single funnel, a characteristic design for tankers during that period.

The vessel was powered by a three-cylinder triple expansion marine steam engine. This engine, coupled with two oil-fired boilers, produced a substantial 8,500 horsepower. Such a propulsion system was typical of the advanced maritime engineering practices of the early 20th century.

The tanker had a length of 351.2 feet, a breadth of 47.0 feet, and a depth of 28.2 feet, with a gross register tonnage of 3934. These dimensions highlight the substantial size and capacity of the Santa Cruz for its era.

== History ==
The tanker Santa Cruz was ordered by the Argentine Naval Commission in London by direct contract with Fairfield Shipbuilding and Engineering Company shipyard, signed in November 1920; the cost was £345,000 STG. The name was assigned by decree OG 101/921 on 6 June 1921.

Santa Cruz was launched on 22 June 1921, completed in November, and arrived in Buenos Aires on 28 December 1921 with an Argentine Navy crew led by Frigate Captain Pedro Casal. She was transferred on 16 January 1922 to YPF with the same name, serving in the YPF fleet until struck in 1948. On 13 October 1942 her crew rescued survivors from the American Liberty ship John Carter Rose sunk by the German submarine U-201 about 620 nmi (1,150 km; 710 mi) east of Trinidad.

Santa Cruz was scrapped in 1948, at Campana, Argentina.

== See also ==
- List of ships of the Argentine Navy
