= Basil Greenhill =

British historian, diplomat (1920–2003)

Dr. Basil Jack Greenhill CB CMG (26 February 1920, in Bristol – 8 April 2003), was a diplomat, museum director and maritime historian.

He went to Bristol Grammar School, before reading philosophy, politics and economics at Bristol University, but his time there was interrupted by wartime naval service. In the navy, he rose from rating to lieutenant, working at the radar research establishment at Malvern, and testing radar on bombers. He emerged in 1946 as a lieutenant, and on the completion of his degree he joined what became the Commonwealth Relations Office, where he stayed until 1966. He was appointed CMG on his retirement in the 1967 New Year Honours.

In 1967 he became the Director of the National Maritime Museum, Greenwich, England, until 1983. He also served a term as vice-president of the Society for Nautical Research. He was also the author of over forty books and numerous articles on maritime history, many of them produced in collaboration with his second wife, Ann Giffard. His best-known book was his two-volume The Merchant Schooners (1951–57). He also published Westcountrymen in Prince Edward's Isle (1967), on Devon shipbuilders in Canada, and Boats And Boatmen of Pakistan (1971).

In 1980, Greenhill received a PhD from Bristol University on his published work, and honorary doctorates from Plymouth University and Hull in 1996 and 2002.

Greenhill was appointed a Companion of the Order of the Bath (CB) in the 1981 Birthday Honours.

Greenhill died at St. Dominick, Cornwall on 8 April 2003.
