= Fairfield Titan =

Coordinates: 55.866704°N 4.323745°W

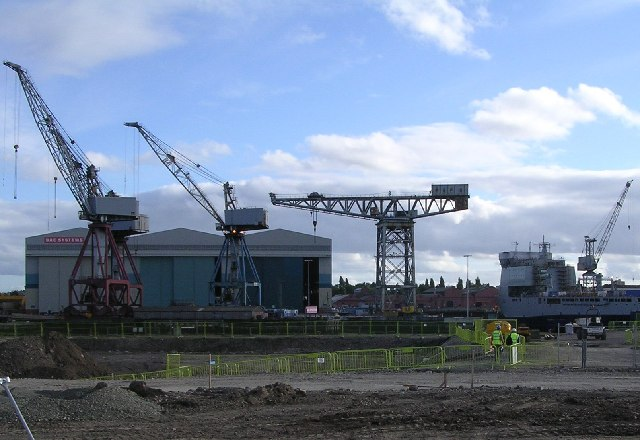
The Fairfield Titan crane, with the RFA Cardigan Bay (L3009) under construction in the background.

The Fairfield Titan was a giant cantilever crane at BAE Systems' Govan shipyard, and the largest such crane on the River Clyde until it was demolished in 2007.

== History ==
The crane was built by Sir William Arrol & Co. at the Fairfield Shipbuilding and Engineering Company yard in 1911, and was first used to install machinery in HMS New Zealand (1911).

The Titan was last used six weeks before its demolition, assembling a Type 45 destroyer. Despite being category A listed, permission was granted for its removal as it was hindering development of the yard, and it was dismantled over a period of three weeks and recycled.

The crane features in the song Shipyard Apprentice by Scottish traditional music group Battlefield Band.

== Design ==
The original 200-tonne (220-short-ton) tested capacity was uprated to 250 t (280 short tons) c. 1941, and then later derated to 220 t (240 short tons). Two 65-brake-horsepower (48-kilowatt) electric motors powered the main hoist, and a 95-brake-horsepower (71-kilowatt) motor actuated an auxiliary hoist to allow loads of up to 40 t (44 short tons) to be lifted at the maximum radius of 161 ft (49.1 m).
