= Timeline of the Gallipoli Campaign =

This article presents the timeline of the Gallipoli Campaign. The period of the proper battle is considered to be 19 February 1915 to 9 January 1916; however, a number of events took place between August 1914 and January 1915 that are relevant to the battle.

== Complete timeline ==
=== August 1914 ===
- 3 – First Lord of the Admiralty, Winston Churchill, confiscates two Ottoman battleships (i.e. HMS Agincourt and HMS Erin) under construction in the United Kingdom.
- 10 – German warships SMS Goeben and SMS Breslau, having evaded Royal Navy pursuit in the Mediterranean, reach the Dardanelles and are granted passage.

=== October 1914 ===
- 28 – Ottoman navy raids Russian Black Sea ports including Odessa and Sevastopol.

=== November 1914 ===
- 2 – Royal Navy squadron, including the battlecruisers HMS Indomitable and HMS Indefatigable, bombard the Turkish forts at the entrance to the Dardanelles.
- 6 – Politics: The United Kingdom declares war on the Ottoman Empire.

=== December 1914 ===
- 13 – Naval operations: British submarine B11 sinks the obsolete Mesûdiye in the straits south of Çanakkale.

=== January 1915 ===
- 13 – British War Council approves plans for a naval operation to force the Dardanelles.
- 15 – Naval operations: Saphir is lost after running aground in the straits.

=== February 1915 ===
- 19 – Naval operations: First attack on the Dardanelles, including HMS Vengeance and HMS Triumph.
- 25 – Naval operations: Second attack on the Dardanelles, led by Vice-Admiral John de Robeck aboard Vengeance.

=== March 1915 ===
- 10 – Naval operations: Night attack in the straits led by Commodore Roger Keyes and the battleship HMS Canopus.
- 12 – General Sir Ian Hamilton is appointed commander of the Mediterranean Expeditionary Force by the Secretary of State for War, Horatio Kitchener.
- 13 – Naval operations: Keyes conducts another night-time minesweeping operation with some success.
- 16 – Naval operations: Admiral Carden, commander of the Allied fleet, resigns due to nervous strain. Vice-Admiral de Robeck takes command.
- 18 – Naval operations: Turkey defeats the final attempt by the British and French fleet to force the straits. Three battleships are sunk by mines. Three battleships and the battlecruiser HMS Inflexible are badly damaged.
- 22 – At a conference between Hamilton and de Robeck aboard HMS Queen Elizabeth, it is decided to make an amphibious landing on the Gallipoli peninsula.

=== April 1915 ===
- 17 – British submarine ae2 runs aground in the straits.
- 25 – British Empire and French forces make amphibious landings on the Gallipoli peninsula.
  - Landing at Cape Helles made by the British 29th Division and elements of the Royal Naval Division.
  - Landing at Anzac Cove made by the Australian and New Zealand Army Corps (ANZAC).
  - French forces make a diversion landing at Kum Kale on the Asian shore.
- 26 – Naval operations: Australian submarine HMAS AE2 becomes the first Allied vessel to pass through the Dardanelles into the Sea of Marmara.
- 27 – Anzac: Under the command of Mustafa Kemal, the Turks mount a counter-attack but fail to drive the Anzacs into the sea.
- 27 – Naval operations: British submarine E14 passes through the Dardanelles to start a successful three-week tour.
- 28 – Helles: First Battle of Krithia British and French forces suffer 4,000 casualties for little gain.
- 28 – Anzac: The Anzac landing is reinforced by four battalions from the Royal Naval Division.

=== May 1915 ===
- 1 – Naval operations: Joule is mined and sunk in the straits.
- 6 – Helles: Second Battle of Krithia commences. British 42nd (East Lancashire) Division begins landing as reinforcements.
- 8 – Helles: Second Battle of Krithia ends.
- 12
  - Helles: HMS Goliath is sunk by the Ottoman torpedo boat Muavenet-i Milliye.
  - Anzac: Australian 1st Light Horse Brigade arrives as reinforcements.
- 13 – Anzac: New Zealand Mounted Rifles Brigade arrives as reinforcements. Royal Naval Division battalions rejoin the rest of the division at Helles.
- 15 – Anzac: Major General W.T. Bridges, commander of the Australian 1st Division is mortally wounded in the leg by a Turkish sniper. He dies at sea three days later.
- 18 – Naval operations: British submarine E11 passes through the straits into the Sea of Marmara.
- 18 – Anzac: Turkish forces mount a massive attack using 42,000 men but are repulsed, suffering 10,000 casualties.
- 19 – Anzac: Australian stretcher-bearer John Simpson Kirkpatrick is killed near Steele's Post.
- 20 – Anzac: The Australian 2nd Light Horse Brigade arrives as reinforcements.
- 21 – Anzac: The Australian 3rd Light Horse Brigade arrives as reinforcements.
- 22 – Anzac: Negotiations commence to arrange an armistice in order to bury the dead in no man's land.
- 24 – Anzac: An armistice is declared from 7.30 a.m. to 4.30 p.m. in which time Turkish and Anzac dead are buried.
- 25
  - Anzac: HMS Triumph is sunk by German U-boat U-21.
  - Naval operations: HMS E11 torpedoes Ottoman transport Stamboul in the Bosphorus, causing panic in Constantinople.
- 27 – Helles: HMS Majestic is sunk by U-21.
- 28-30 Battle for No.3 Post

=== June 1915 ===
- 4 – Helles: Third Battle of Krithia British and French forces mount a limited attack but still fail to reach their objectives.
- 28 – Helles: Battle of Gully Ravine starts.

=== July 1915 ===
- 5 – Helles: Battle of Gully Ravine ends with the British repelling a large Turkish counter-attack.
- 12 – Helles: British 52nd (Lowland) Division and Royal Naval Division attack along Achi Baba Nullah.

=== August 1915 ===
- 3 – Anzac: Reinforcements for the forthcoming offensive begin landing, including the British 13th (Western) Division.
- 6 – Battle of Sari Bair, also known as the August Offensive, commences.
  - Helles: Battle of Krithia Vineyard diversion commences with an attack by the 88th Brigade of the British 29th Division.
  - Anzac: Battle of Lone Pine diversion commences at 6.30 a.m. with the Australian 1st Division capturing Turkish trenches. Fighting continues for six days in which time seven Victoria Crosses are awarded.
  - Suvla: At 10.00 p.m. the British 11th (Northern) Division, part of IX Corps, begins landing.
  - Anzac: Under cover of darkness, two columns of Anzac, British & Indian troops break out to the north, heading for the heights of Chunuk Bair and Hill 971.
- 7
  - Anzac: Battle of the Nek At 4.30 a.m. another futile diversion virtually wipes out two regiments of the 3rd Light Horse Brigade.
  - Suvla: The British 10th (Irish) Division begins landing.
  - Helles: Fighting at Krithia Vineyard continues with an attack by the 42nd Division.
  - Anzac: After a lengthy delay, the New Zealand Infantry Brigade attempts to capture Chunuk Bair but fails.
- 8
  - Anzac: Battle of Chunuk Bair Attacking at 3.00 a.m., New Zealand and British infantry gain a foothold on Chunuk Bair; Lt Col William Malone is killed.
  - Naval operations: British submarine HMS E11 torpedoes the Barbaros Hayreddin off Bulair.
- 9 – Anzac: A general attack by the Allies on the heights of Chunuk Bair, Hill Q and Hill 971 fails.
- 10
  - Anzac: Battle of Chunuk Bair ends when the Turks, led by Mustafa Kemal, drive the Allies off the heights.
  - Suvla: British 53rd (Welsh) Division attacks Scimitar Hill, suffering heavy casualties.
- 12 – Anzac: Battle of Lone Pine ends.
- 13 – Helles: Battle of Krithia Vineyard ends.
- 15 – Suvla: General Sir Frederick Stopford is sacked as commander of IX Corps.
- 21 – Final British offensive of the campaign launched to consolidate Anzac and Suvla landings.
  - Suvla: Battle of Scimitar Hill IX Corps makes a final attempt to seize Scimitar and W Hills.
  - Anzac: Battle of Hill 60 begins.
- 29 – Battle of Hill 60 ends.

=== September 1915 ===
- 12 – The 26th Infantry Battalion at ANZAC arrives as reinforcements, deployed to Taylor's Hollow.
- 19 – Royal Newfoundland Regiment arrives as reinforcements.

=== October 1915 ===
- 15 – General Sir Ian Hamilton is sacked as commander of the Mediterranean Expeditionary Force.
- 28 – General Sir Charles Monro arrives to assume command of the Mediterranean Expeditionary Force.
- 30 – Naval operations: Turquoise runs aground while returning through the Dardanelles and is captured.
- 31 – Suvla: Destroyer HMS Louis runs aground in a storm and is wrecked.

=== November 1915 ===
- 6 – Naval operations: British submarine E20 is ambushed and sunk in the Sea of Marmara by German U-boat U-14.
- 15 – Field Marshal Horatio Kitchener, the Secretary of State for War, visits Gallipoli.
- 22 – Kitchener recommends evacuation of Anzac and Suvla.
- 27 – A fierce storm and blizzard, lasting three days, strikes the peninsula.

=== December 1915 ===
- 7 – Politics: The British Cabinet orders the evacuation of Anzac and Suvla.
- 18 – Start of final evacuation of Anzac and Suvla.
- 20 – Evacuation of Anzac and Suvla completed before dawn.
- 28 – Politics: The British Cabinet orders the evacuation of Helles.

=== January 1916 ===
- 7 – Helles: British garrison reduced to 19,000. Turkish assault launched along Gully Spur.
- 9 – Helles: Last British troops depart the Gallipoli peninsula.

== Bibliography ==
- Bennett, Geoffrey (2005). Naval Battles of the First World War. Pen & Sword Military Classics. ISBN 978-1-84415-300-8.
- Fromkin, David (1989). A Peace to End All Peace: The Fall of the Ottoman Empire and the Creation of the Modern Middle East. H. Holt. ISBN 978-0-8050-0857-9.
- Hastings, Max (2013). Catastrophe 1914: Europe Goes to War. Alfred A. Knopf. ISBN 978-0-307-59705-2.
- Travers, Tim (2004). Gallipoli: 1915. The Mill, Brimscombe Port, Stroud, Gloucester: Tempus. ISBN 0-7524-2972-8.
