= XV Brigade, Royal Horse Artillery =

Former horse artillery brigade of the British Army

XV Brigade, RHA
- Active: January 1915 – April 1919
- Country: United Kingdom
- Branch: British Army
- Type: Artillery
- Size: Battalion
- Part of: 29th Division
- Engagements: World War I Gallipoli Western Front

XV Brigade, Royal Horse Artillery was a brigade (Note: The basic organic unit of the Royal Artillery was, and is, the Battery. When grouped together they formed brigades, in the same way that infantry battalions or cavalry regiments were grouped together in brigades. At the outbreak of World War I, a field artillery brigade of headquarters (4 officers, 37 other ranks), three batteries (5 and 193 each), and a brigade ammunition column (4 and 154) had a total strength just under 800 so was broadly comparable to an infantry battalion (just over 1,000) or a cavalry regiment (about 550). Like an infantry battalion, an artillery brigade was usually commanded by a Lieutenant-Colonel. Artillery brigades were redesignated as regiments in 1938.) of the Royal Horse Artillery formed during World War I. It served with 29th Division in the Gallipoli Campaign and on the Western Front. It was disbanded after the war.

== History ==
=== Duplicate numbering ===
Strangely, two Royal Horse Artillery brigades were formed early in World War I and simultaneously designated as XV Brigade, RHA. The first was formed on 1 October 1914 for service with the 3rd Cavalry Division and commanded C, G and K Batteries, RHA. It was renumbered as IV Brigade, RHA in May 1915. The second was formed in January 1915 and is the subject of the current article.

=== Formation ===
XV Brigade, RHA was formed at Leamington, Warwickshire in January 1915 with:

- B Battery of I Brigade, RHA at Ambala, India
- L Battery at St John's Wood Barracks, reformed after the action at Néry
- Y Battery of XIII Brigade, RHA at Mhow, India
- XV RHA Brigade Ammunition Column

On formation, the batteries were re-equipped with four 18 pounders each.

The brigade was assigned to the 29th Division. In March 1915, it embarked at Avonmouth and sailed for Alexandria (via Malta) arriving from 28 March. On 7 April, the division began re-embarking at Alexandria and sailed for Gallipoli.

=== Gallipoli ===
The division started landing at Cape Helles from 7am on 25 April and served on the Gallipoli Peninsula until January 1915. While at Helles, the division saw action at the Capture of Sedd el Bahr (26 April), the First (28 April), Second (6–8 May) and Third Battles of Krithia (4 June), the Battle of Gully Ravine (28 June – 2 July) and the Battle of Krithia Vineyard (6–13 August). From 16 August to the night of 19/20 December 1915, the bulk of the division served at Suvla but the brigade remained at Helles. On the night of 7/8 January 1916, the division was evacuated from Helles.

The division moved to Egypt where it was concentrated at Suez. In March 1916, it was transferred to France, landing at Marseille and reaching the Somme area (near Pont-Remy) between 15 and 29 March. On 31 March, 369th Battery, RFA arrived from England and joined the brigade; it left for 132nd Brigade, RFA (29th Division) on 20 May. The brigade remained on the Western Front for the rest of the war.

=== Western Front ===
The first action on the Western Front was the Battle of the Somme. On 1 July 1916, the brigade took part in the Battle of Albert as part of VIII Corps, Fourth Army.

On 12 September 1916, the brigade was reorganized. 132nd Brigade, RFA was broken up and its three batteries were used to make up XV Brigade, RHA and 17th Brigade, RFA to six 18 pounders each. At the same time, 460th (H) Battery, RFA (four 4.5" howitzers) joined the brigade from 17th Brigade, RFA. It was made up to six howitzers on 19 January 1917. The final change in organization occurred on 27 November 1916 when Y Battery was transferred to the 1st Cavalry Division and 1/1st Warwickshire Battery, RHA (TF) was received in exchange.

In 1917, the brigade supported the division in a large number of major actions including the Battle of Arras (April to May, First, Second and Third Battles of the Scarpe), the Third Battle of Ypres (August to October, battles of Langemarck, Brodseinde and Poelcappelle) and the Battle of Cambrai (November and December, including the Tank Attack and the German Counter-attacks).

1918 likewise saw a number of major actions, including the Battle of the Lys (April, the battles of Estaires, Messines, Hazelbrouck and Bailleul), the Advance to Victory (August and September) and the Final Advance in Flanders (September and October, Fifth Battle of Ypres and Battle of Courtrai).

At the Armistice, it was still serving with 29th Division with B Battery RHA, L Battery RHA, 1/1st Warwickshire Battery RHA (TF) and 460th (H) Battery RFA (eighteen 18 pounders and six 4.5" howitzers).

=== Dissolved ===
Still with 29th Division, the brigade advanced into Germany to take part in the Occupation of the Rhineland. It left 29th Division in December 1918 and returned to England from Germany in April 1919. The brigade was disbanded at this time. 460th (H) Battery was disbanded, 1/1st Warwickshire Battery, RHA (TF) was disembodied, B Battery joined I Brigade, RHA and L Battery joined VII Brigade, RHA, both in the United Kingdom.

== Bibliography ==
- Becke, Archibald F. (1935). Order of Battle of Divisions Part 1–The Regular British Divisions. London: HMSO. OCLC 4405016.
- Clarke, W.G. (1993). Horse Gunners: The Royal Horse Artillery, 200 Years of Panache and Professionalism. Woolwich: The Royal Artillery Institution. ISBN 09520762-0-9.
- Frederick, J.B.M. (1984). Lineage Book of British Land Forces 1660–1978. Wakefield, Yorkshire: Microform Academic Publishers. ISBN 1-85117-009-X.
- Perry, F.W. (1993). Order of Battle of Divisions Part 5B. Indian Army Divisions. Newport: Ray Westlake Military Books. ISBN 1-871167-23-X.
- Order of Battle of the British Armies in France, November 11th, 1918. France: General Staff, GHQ. 1918.
