= Battles of Krithia =

1915 WWI battles in Gallipoli, Ottoman Empire

- Part of the Gallipoli campaign of World War I
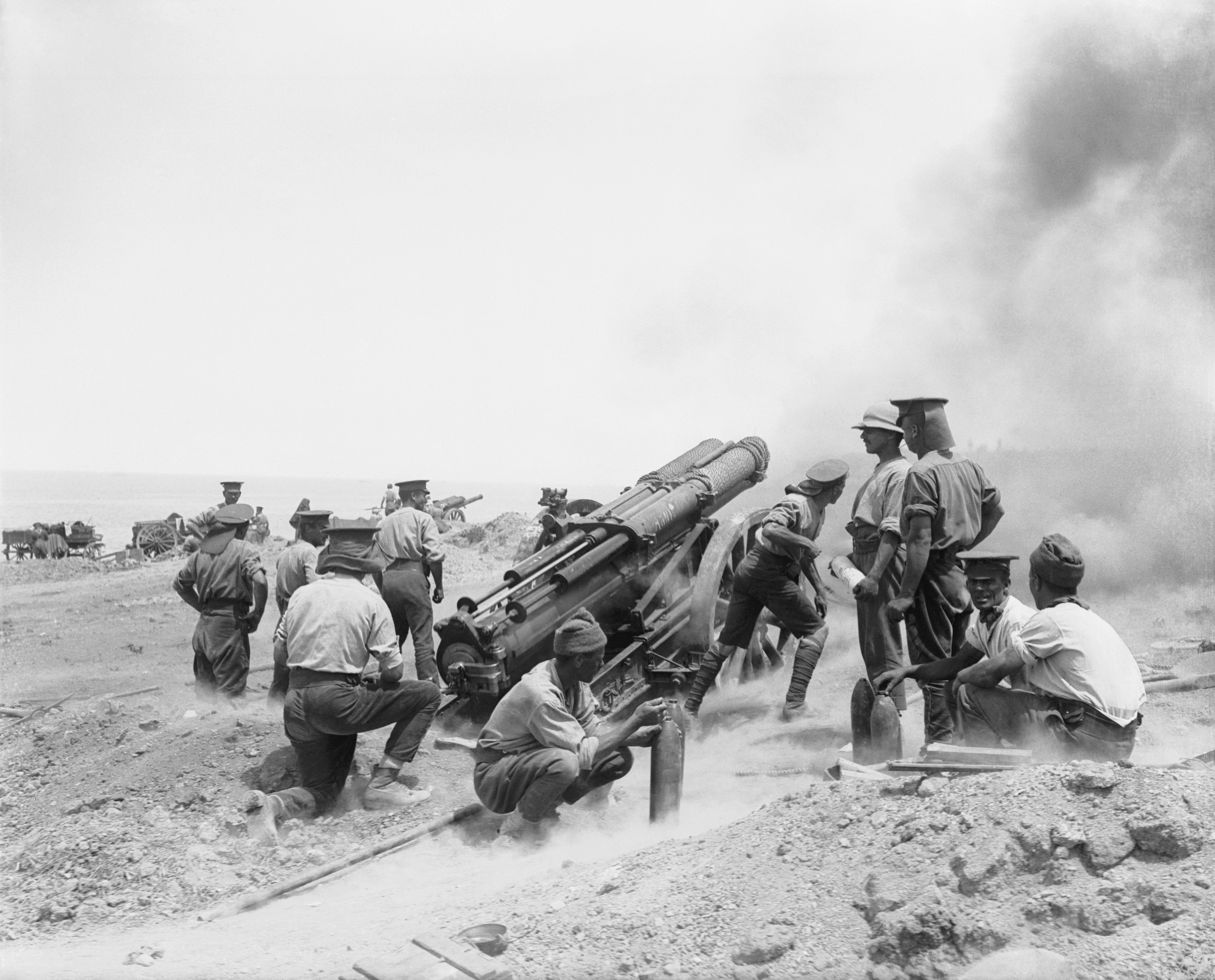
- Third Battle of Krithia
Date	28 April – 13 August 1915
Location	Krithia, Gallipoli, Ottoman Empire 40°04′44″N 26°12′14″E
Result	Ottoman victory

Belligerents
Allied Powers: United Kingdom and Empire: New Zealand; Australia; India; France	Ottoman Empire

Commanders and leaders
(British Empire) Aylmer Hunter-Weston (United Kingdom of Great Britain and Ireland) Br-Gen. H.E. Street (British Empire) Joseph Trumpeldor (French Third Republic) Antoine Masnou	(Ottoman Empire) Halil Sami Bey (Ottoman Empire) Trommer Paşa (Ottoman Empire) Fevzi Çakmak (German Empire) Otto Liman von Sanders (German Empire) Erich Weber

Casualties and losses
18,121 casualties	14,888 casualties

During the Gallipoli campaign in 1915, several battles were fought near the village of Krithia, today Alçıtepe. The village was an objective of the first day of the landing, 25 April 1915. Over the following months, invading British Empire (including the 89th Punjabis of the British Indian Army) and French troops, who had landed near Cape Helles at the end of the peninsula, made several attempts to capture the village. It was never reached; the Ottoman defenders successfully repulsed every assault.

The attacks came to be known as:

- The First Battle of Krithia - 28 April
- The Second Battle of Krithia - 6 May - 8 May
- The Third Battle of Krithia - 4 June
- The Battle of Krithia Vineyard - 6 August – 13 August

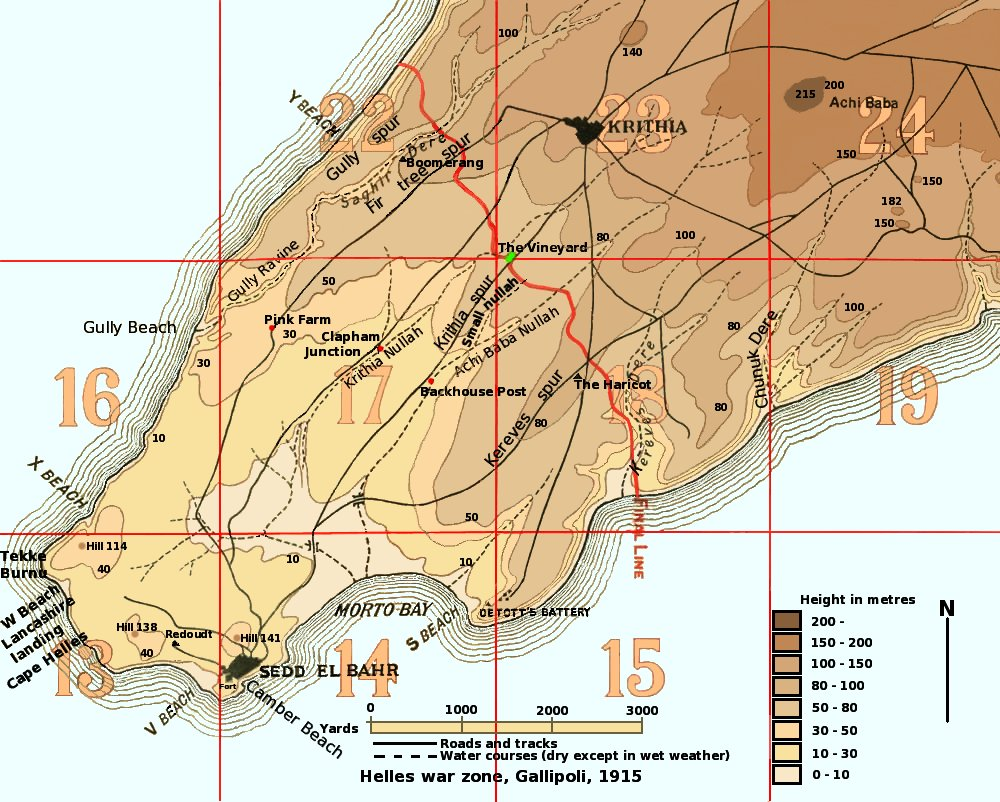
Krithia is in square 23. Cape Helles is in square 13
