= Jimmy Durham =

First African soldier in the British Army (1883–1910)

James Francis Durham
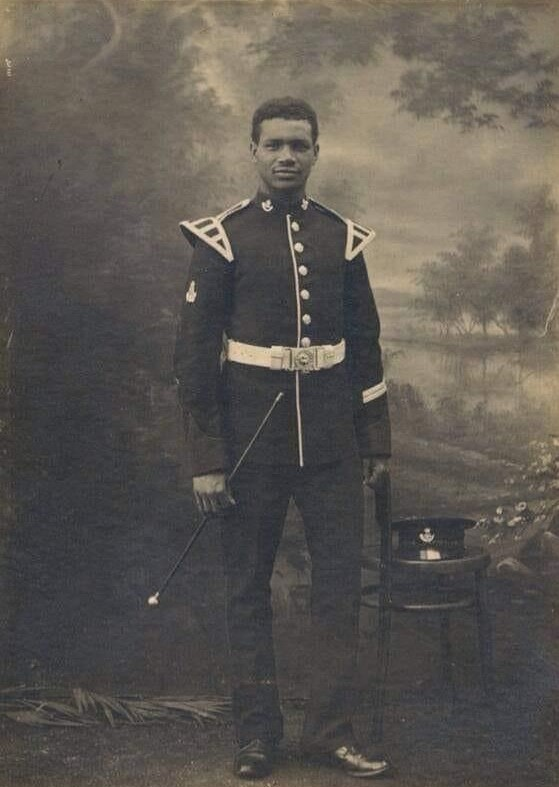
- James Francis Durham in 1909
- Born: Mustapha c. 1883; Sudan
- Died: 8 August 1910 (aged 26–27); Fermoy, County Cork, Ireland
- Burial place: Fermoy Military Cemetery
- Spouse: Jane Green
- Children: 1
- Military career
- Allegiance: United Kingdom
- Branch: British Army
- Service years: 1899–1910
- Rank: Private first class
- Service number: 6758
- Unit: Durham Light Infantry
- Known for: First African soldier in the British Army

James Francis Durham (c. 1883 – 8 August 1910), originally named Mustapha (Arabic: مصطفي), was a Sudanese child found and adopted by the Durham Light Infantry after the Battle of Ginnis in 1885 during the Mahdist War. He is likely the first African soldier in the British Army.

== Early life and education ==
In 1885, a young Mustapha was found alone near the Nile by the 2nd Battalion of The Durham Light Infantry (DLI) after the Battle of Ginnis against the Mahdist State. Following the battle, a patrol led by Lieutenant Henry de Beauvoir de Lisle attacked the barge on which the boy's mother was trying to escape the area with him. The troops found the child near a river barge on the Nile. The boy's father, a Sheik (officer) in the Sudanese army, had been killed in the battle, and he had been separated from his mother, leaving him alone. The regiment adopted him, first naming him Jimmy Dervish before christening him James Francis Durham, named after two soldiers and the regiment itself, and he was raised within the battalion.

== Career ==
Initially treated as a regimental mascot, James quickly adapted, learning English and integrating into the DLI's life. The soldiers paid for his education as they travelled through Egypt and India, where he learned to play the bugle. In 1899, at approximately 14, he officially joined the DLI as a boy bandsman, an enlistment approved by Queen Victoria due to its unique nature. On 23 May 1899, James – Boy Soldier Number 6758 – became the first African soldier in the British Army.

Known for his athleticism and commitment to temperance, he managed the battalion's branch of the Army Temperance Association.

== Personal life ==
In 1908, James returned to England with the regiment, where he married Jane Green of Bishop Auckland, the daughter of a local blacksmith and sister of a Quartermaster Sergeant with the DLI. While stationed in Fermoy, Ireland, he died of pneumonia on 8 August 1910, just weeks before the birth of his daughter, Frances. He was buried in Fermoy Military Cemetery.
