= Halil Sami Bey =

Ottoman army officer (1866–1925)

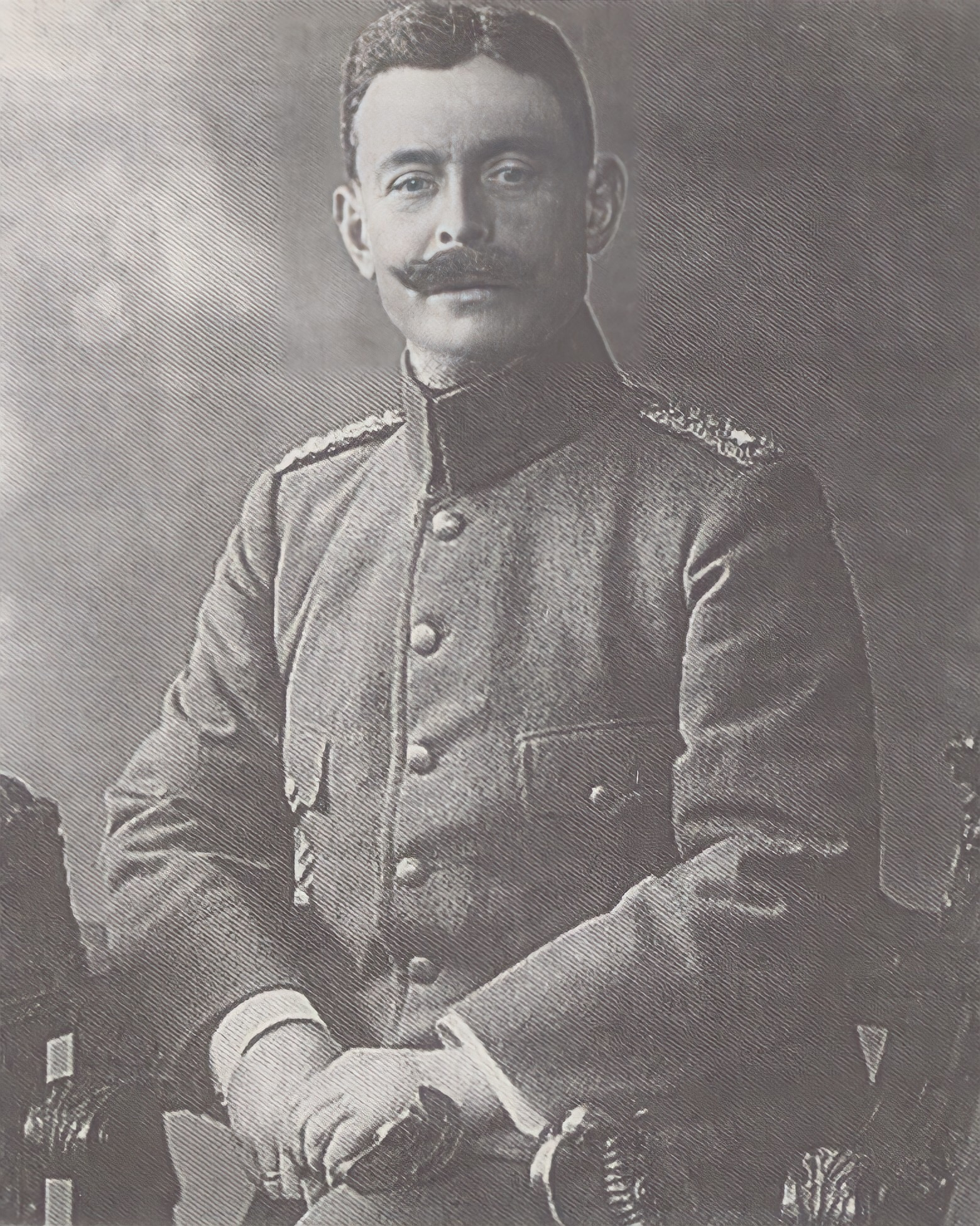
- Born: 1866
- Died: 1925 (age 59)
- Military career
- Allegiance: Ottoman Empire; Turkey
- Branch: Ottoman Army
- Rank: Colonel
- Commands: Ottoman 9th Division
- Conflicts: World War I; Gallipoli campaign; Landing at Cape Helles; First Battle of Krithia; Third Battle of Krithia; Armenian–Turkish conflict; Muslim uprisings in Kars and Sharur–Nakhichevan

Halil Sami Bey (1866 – 1925) was an Ottoman Army colonel, who served in the First World War. He successfully managed to fend off British and French forces during the Landing at Cape Helles.

== Career ==
Halil Sami was in charge of the Ottoman 9th Division on the morning of 25 April 1915, known as the First Battle of Krithia. He was responsible for a very difficult section of the peninsula. His division faced the British 29th Division landing on 5 individual beaches with an initial force of 6 infantry battalions and 2 infantry regiments. The total force on the beaches was the 6th Company defending Sarıtepe Altı and İkiz Koyu, 12th, 10th, 9th and 11th Companies defending Teke koyu and Ertuğrul koyu with a platoon defending the Zığındere (Gully Ravine). The 10th Company, with the heroic efforts of Yahya Çavuş who fought against 3,000 British infantry with one squad under his command, was totally wiped out with all the other Turkish forces defending the beaches.

After the 25th, the battle turned into continuous trench warfare with the British and French forces not being able to reach Altçıtepe, a crucial hill which would open the way to the capturing of the Gallipoli peninsula from the south. The Kirte and Zigindere battles inflicted heavy casualties on both sides with the majority dead being the Turkish defenders.

Colonel Halil Sami did not die at Gallipoli during the Gallipoli campaign. The memorials in Gallipoli erroneously state that he was killed in action but this is not true. There is not much information on what happened to him after the war but he probably joined the forces of Mustafa Kemal Pasha and got a commission in the Turkish Army during the Turkish War of Independence.

He later quarreled with General Otto Liman von Sanders about the war plans. He was taken off duty on 10 July 1915 and forced to retire from the army. He later participated in the Turkish War of Independence where he joined the forces of Mustafa Kemal Pasha and fought against the invading Greek, British and French armies.
