= Battle of Scimitar Hill =

1915 battle in World War I

Coordinates: 40°18′11″N 26°13′48″E

- Part of Gallipoli campaign
Date	21 August 1915
Location	Suvla, Gallipoli, Ottoman Empire
Result	Ottoman victory

Belligerents
British Empire	Ottoman Empire

Commanders and leaders
(United Kingdom of Great Britain and Ireland) Beauvoir De Lisle	(Ottoman Empire) Mustafa Kemal Bey

Strength
11th and 29th divisions (14,300 men)	12th Division; 9th Division (6 Battalions); 6th Division(Reserve, did not engage)

Casualties and losses
5,300	2,600

The Battle of Scimitar Hill (Turkish: Yusufçuk Tepe Muharebesi, lit. 'Battle of the Dragonfly Hill') was the last offensive mounted by the British at Suvla during the Battle of Gallipoli in World War I. It was also the largest single-day attack ever mounted by the Allies at Gallipoli, involving three divisions. The purpose of the attack was to remove the immediate Ottoman threat from the exposed Suvla landing and to link with the ANZAC sectors to the south. Launched on 21 August 1915 to coincide with the simultaneous attack on Hill 60, it was a costly failure, in which the Turks were forced to use all their reserves in "severe and bloody fighting" far into the night, with some Turkish trenches lost and retaken twice.

== Prelude ==
Paralysis had set in to the British campaign in the Dardanelles after repeated failures to advance at Helles on the tip of the peninsula since the original 25 April landings. In August a new offensive, known as the Battle of Sari Bair, was opened at Suvla in an attempt to regain the initiative from the Ottomans. Two divisions of Lieutenant-General Sir Frederick Stopford's IX Corps were landed at Suvla on the night of 6 August while a simultaneous breakout was made from the long-stagnant Anzac sector to the south of Suvla.

Scimitar Hill, so named because of its curved summit, and the neighbouring W Hills to the south were part of the Anafarta Spur that marked the southern edge of the Suvla sector. Their capture had originally been first-day (7 August) objectives but General Stopford was exceedingly hesitant about making any major advances without artillery support. Consequently, the troops of the British 11th (Northern) Division (which had made the initial landing on the night of 6 August) and the 10th (Irish) Division (which had landed the following morning) did not advance from the immediate environs of the beach until 8 August, by which time they were already exhausted from lack of water and being under constant shrapnel and sniper fire.

On the morning of 9 August, the British made their first effort to advance towards the high ground to the east, a ridge called Tekke Tepe. Scimitar Hill, which guarded the approach to this ridge from the southwest along the Anafarta Spur, had been captured unopposed by the 6th Battalion, The East Yorkshire Regiment, on 8 August but was then abandoned. The British attempted to recapture the hill on 9 August and in the intense fighting it changed hands a number of times before the British were forced off around midday. Despite the arrival of reinforcements in the form of the 53rd (Welsh) Division on 9 August and the 54th (East Anglian) Division on 10 August, any hopes the British had of a swift victory at Suvla were now gone as the Ottomans consolidated their hold on the surrounding ridges.

On 10 August the 53rd Division made another attack at Scimitar Hill, which was another massive failure for the British and effectively ruined the division as a fighting unit within two days of its landing.

== Battle ==
On 15 August Stopford was sacked and Major-General Beauvoir De Lisle, commander of the 29th Division, was made temporary commander of IX Corps until Lieutenant-General Julian Byng could be sent from France. De Lisle abandoned any immediate thoughts of a major offensive — preparations for a major push by the 54th Division had been made at great cost but little effect on 12 August. Instead, he intended to secure the ground he held and make a strong link to Anzac to the south, where, as at Suvla, the original August objectives had proven unreachable. This required the capture of Scimitar Hill, the W Hills and Hill 60.

To make the attack from Suvla, De Lisle had the dismounted yeomanry of the 2nd Mounted Division and the 29th Division, which had moved from Helles where it had borne the brunt of the fighting since the landings of 25 April. The plan for 21 August was to attack Scimitar Hill with the 29th Division and the W Hills with the 11th Division, keeping the yeomanry in reserve near the beach. As was so often the case at Gallipoli, the preliminary artillery barrage looked impressive but achieved little. The British had no sight of their targets, which were obscured by mist and smoke, whereas the Ottoman artillery had a clear view of the entire Suvla battlefield and ample opportunity to register their targets.

The 11th Division attempt to capture the W Hills, collapsed in confusion when confronted by an Ottoman strong-point and artillery fire. As a consequence when the 1st Battalion of the Royal Inniskilling Fusiliers managed to capture the summit of Scimitar Hill, they found themselves under fire from the defenders higher up the Anafarta Spur to the east and from the W Hills to the south. The Irish retreated from the summit while the undergrowth around them was set ablaze by the shellfire, incinerating the wounded as they lay helpless.

Around 5:00 p.m. the troops of the 2nd Mounted Division were ordered forward from their reserve position on Lala Baba, near the beach. They advanced, marching in formation, across the bed of a dry salt lake. By this time the air was clouded by mist and smoke so that they had little idea of where they were going. The 5,000 men of the five brigades formed in columns by regiment and, marching in extended order, were easy targets for the shrapnel. Most of them halted in the cover of Green Hill, west of Scimitar Hill but Brigadier-General Lord Longford, led his 2nd South Midland Mounted Brigade in a charge over Green Hill and up to the summit of Scimitar Hill. Continuing on, Lord Longford was cut off and killed. The yeomanry too were driven from the summit. The attack at Scimitar Hill on 21 August was the last attempt by the British to advance at Suvla. The front line remained between Green Hill and Scimitar Hill for the remainder of the campaign until the evacuation on 20 December.

== Aftermath ==
=== Casualties ===
In one day of fighting the British suffered 5,300 casualties out of the 14,300 soldiers who participated.

=== Victoria Cross ===
The only two Victoria Crosses awarded at Suvla were made for rescuing of wounded at Scimitar Hill, one on 9 August by Captain Percy Hansen and the other following the 21 August battle by Private Frederick Potts.
