= 29th Division (United Kingdom) =

- Active: January 1915 – 1919
- Country: United Kingdom
- Branch: British Army
- Type: Infantry
- Size: Division
- Nickname: "Incomparable Division"
- Engagements: First World War Gallipoli campaign Landing at Cape Helles First Battle of Krithia Second Battle of Krithia Third Battle of Krithia Battle of Gully Ravine Battle of Sari Bair Battle of Krithia Vineyard Battle of Scimitar Hill Western Front Battle of the Somme Battle of Passchendaele Battle of Cambrai (1917)

The 29th Division, known as the Incomparable Division, was an infantry division of the British Army, formed in early 1915 by combining various Regular Army units that had been acting as garrisons around the British Empire. Under the command of Major-General Aylmer Hunter-Weston, the division fought throughout the Gallipoli Campaign, including the original landing at Cape Helles. From 1916 to the end of the war the division fought on the Western Front in Belgium and France.

According to the published divisional history (see reference below), 'The total casualties of the 29th Division amounted to something like 94,000. Gallipoli alone accounted for 34,000. This must be, if not a record, among the highest totals in any division ... The number of Victoria Crosses won by members of this division was 27 (12 at Gallipoli). This constitutes a record'. A large commemorative Portland stone obelisk, built in 1921 to remember the Division's review by King George V before they were sent to Gallipoli, is located on a roundabout on the A45 just north of Stretton-on-Dunsmore, Warwickshire. A memorial to the 29th Division is located in Beaumont-Hamel Newfoundland Memorial. Lieutenant-General Beauvoir De Lisle, wartime commander of the 29th British Division, unveiled the monument the morning of the official opening of the site on 7 June 1925.

== Unit history ==
=== Gallipoli ===
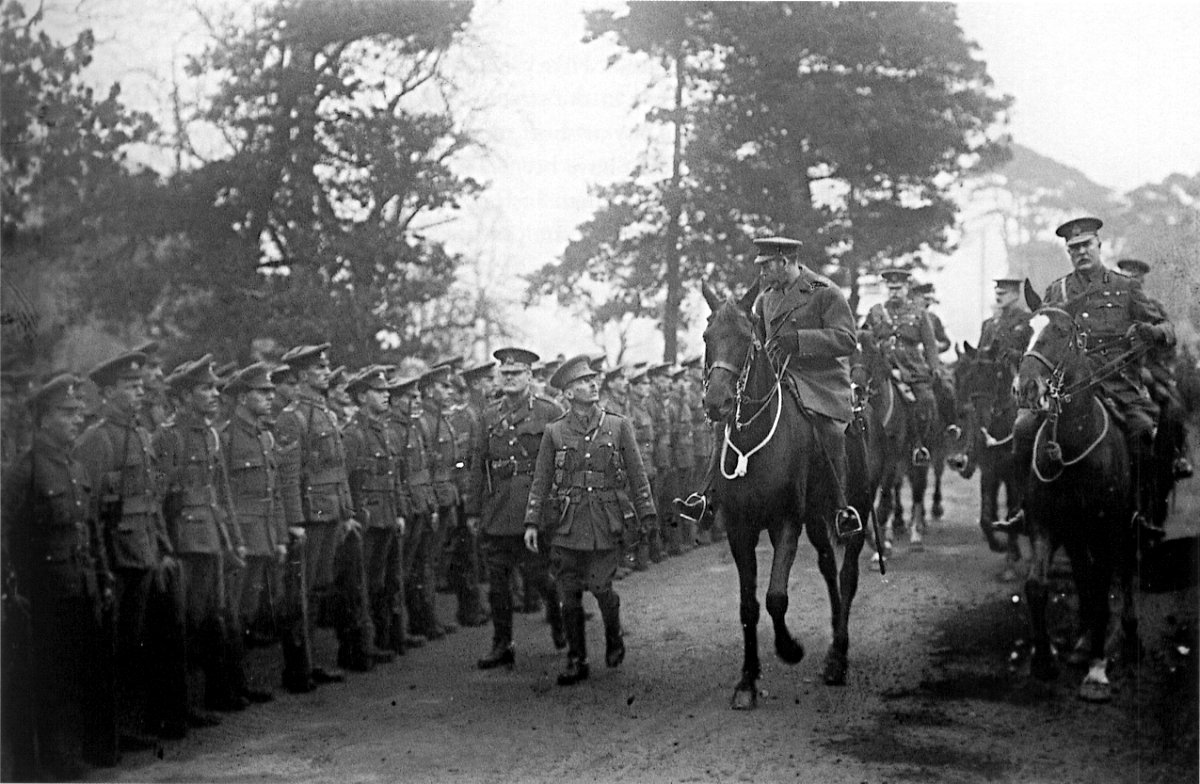
King George V inspects the 29th Division at Dunchurch, 12 March 1915.

The 29th Division, commanded by Major-General Aylmer Hunter-Weston, an officer of the Royal Engineers who had distinguished himself in command of an infantry brigade on the Western Front, served on the Gallipoli peninsula, a point in the strategic Dardanelles straits between the Black Sea and the Aegean Sea (and thus the Mediterranean). The division was there for the duration of the ill-fated campaign. It made the first landings as part of the Mediterranean Expeditionary Force in April 1915. On the morning of 25 April 1915 the Battle of Gallipoli began when battalions from the division's 86th and 87th brigades landed at five beaches around Cape Helles at the tip of the peninsula. Three of the landings faced little or no opposition but were not exploited. The two main landings, at V and W Beaches on either side of the cape, met with fierce Turkish resistance and the landing battalions were decimated.

The original objectives of the first day of the campaign had been the village of Krithia and the nearby hill of Achi Baba. The first concerted attempt to capture these was made by the division three days after the landings on 28 April. In this First Battle of Krithia an advance up the peninsula was made but the division was halted short of its objective and suffered around 3,000 casualties. The attack was resumed on 6 May with the launch of the Second Battle of Krithia. On this occasion the 88th Brigade attacked along Fig Tree Spur and, after two days of fighting without significant progress, it was relieved by the New Zealand Infantry Brigade. On 24 May Major-General Beauvoir De Lisle took over command of the division from Hunter-Weston who had been promoted to command VIII Corps.

On 4 June the 88th Brigade was once more required to make an advance along Fig Tree Spur in the Third Battle of Krithia. In the subsequent counter-attacks, Second Lieutenant G.R.D Moor of the 2nd Battalion, Hampshire Regiment, was awarded the Victoria Cross for shooting four of his own men who attempted to retreat.

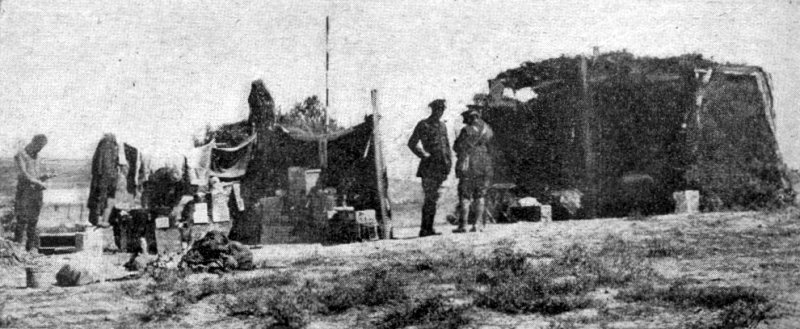
Headquarters of the 29th Division at Cape Helles.

The division finally saw successful fighting at Helles during the Battle of Gully Ravine on 28 June when the 86th Brigade managed to advance along Gully Spur. As a prelude to the launch of the August Offensive, a "diversion" was carried out at Helles on 6 August to prevent the Turks from withdrawing troops. In what became known as the Battle of Krithia Vineyard, the 88th Brigade made another costly and futile attack along the exposed Krithia Spur.

At Suvla, the Battle of Scimitar Hill on 21 August was the final push of the failed August Offensive. The 29th Division had been moved from Helles to Suvla to participate. The 87th Brigade was briefly able to capture the summit of the hill but was soon forced to retreat.

The division was evacuated from Gallipoli on 2 January 1916 and moved to Egypt for several weeks before being sent to France in March.

=== Somme ===
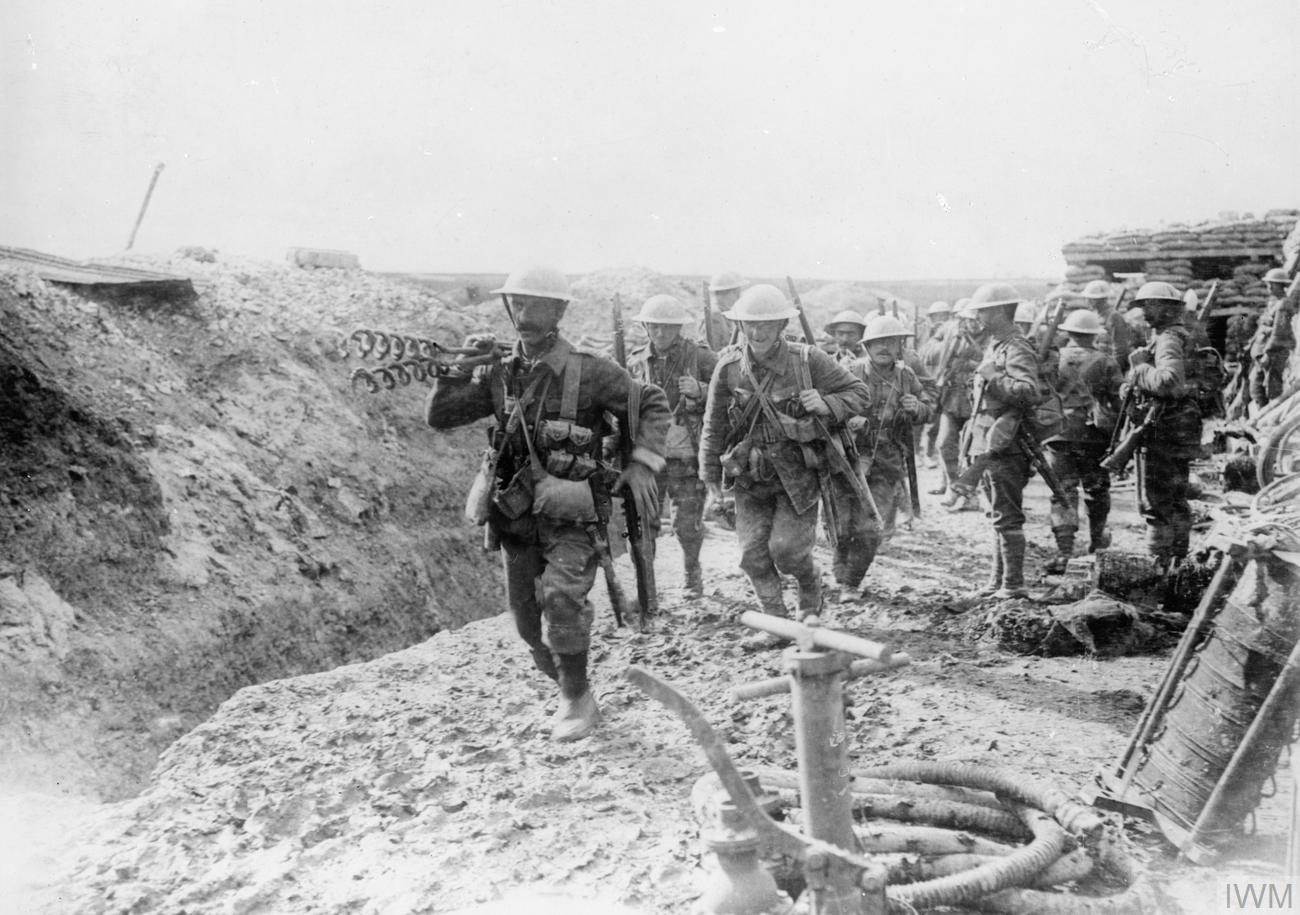
Wiring party of the 1st Battalion, Lancashire Fusiliers going up to the trenches, Beaumont Hamel, France, July 1916. Note a trench pump in the foreground.

Passing through the Mediterranean port of Marseilles the 29th Division arrived in the rear of the Somme battle front from 15 to 29 March 1916. From this time the division was put into the British Front in the area north of the Ancre River, near to the German-held village of Beaumont Hamel. For the following three months the battalions in the division spent their time doing tours of trenches and training behind the lines to prepare for the large British offensive against the German position planned for the end of June. Following a 7-day artillery bombardment of the German front and rear areas, the battalions of the 29th Division were in position in their Assembly Trenches in the early hours of Saturday 1 July.

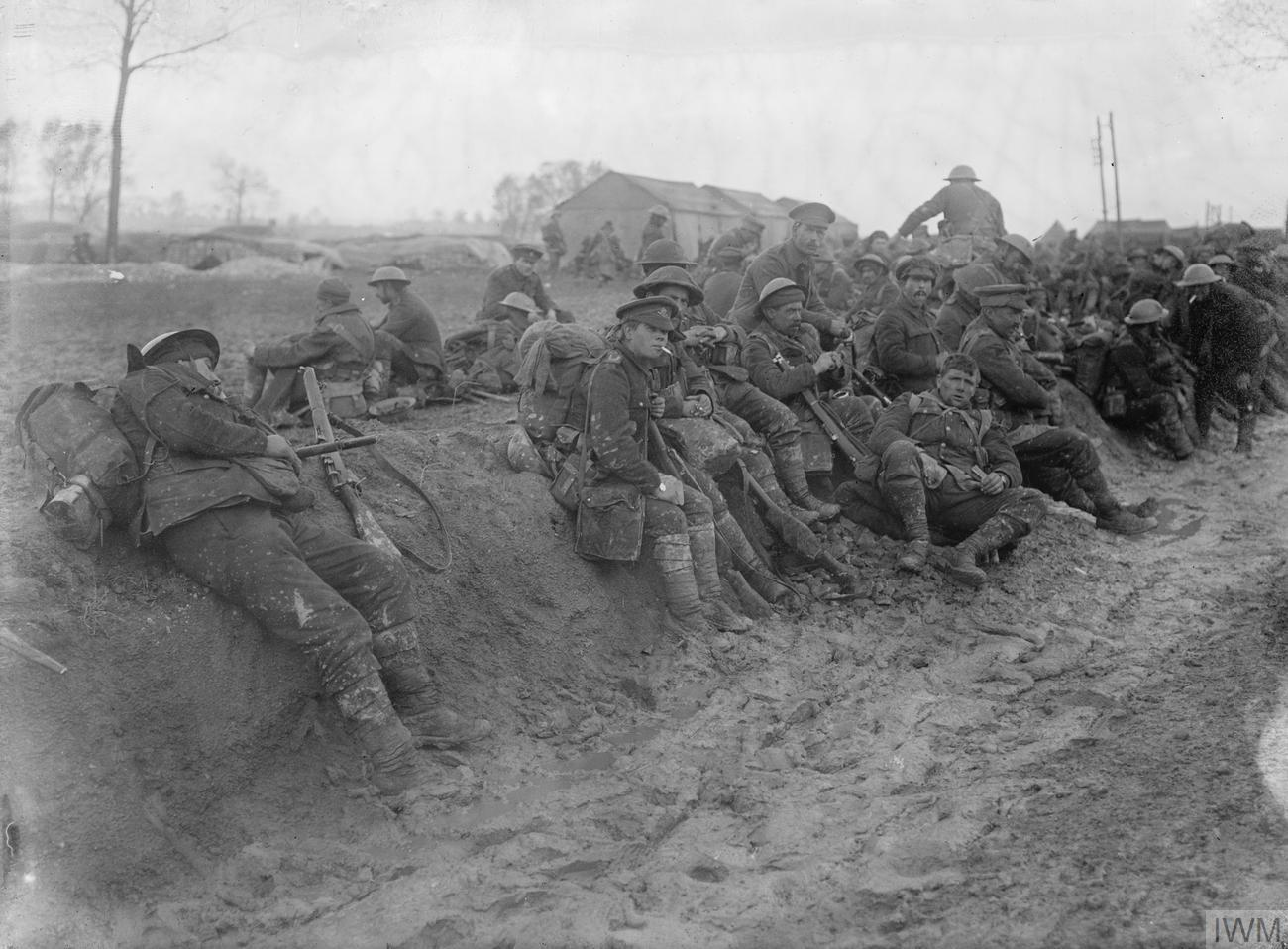
Tommies of the 4th Battalion, Worcestershire Regiment resting by the roadside near Aveluy, France, September 1916.

At 07:20 hours the huge Hawthorn mine was blown on the left of the division's position. The leading battalions in the attack left the British front line trench at 07:30 hours. The British casualties were severe, with many men never reaching the German front line. The men of the Newfoundland Regiment moved forward at about 09:00 hours to follow on behind the leading battalion in the advance of 88th Brigade. Many of them were shot down trying to clamber overground to cover the few yards from where they were in the rear of the British front line to start their advance down the hill.

== Order of battle ==
The following units served with the division:

=== 86th Brigade ===
- 2nd Battalion, Royal Fusiliers
- 1st Battalion, Lancashire Fusiliers
- 1st Battalion, Royal Munster Fusiliers (left April 1916)
- 1st Battalion, Royal Dublin Fusiliers (left October 1917, rejoined April 1918)
- 2/3rd (City of London) Battalion, London Regiment (joined August 1915, left January 1916)
- 16th (Service) Battalion, Middlesex Regiment (Public Schools) (joined April 1916, disbanded February 1918)
- 1st Battalion, Royal Guernsey Light Infantry (joined October 1917, left April 1918)
- 86th Machine Gun Company (formed 26 February 1916, moved to 29th Battalion Machine Gun Corps (M.G.C.) on 15 Feb 1918)
- 86th Trench Mortar Battery (formed 21 April 1916)

=== 87th Brigade ===
- 2nd Battalion, South Wales Borderers
- 1st Battalion, King's Own Scottish Borderers
- 1st Battalion, Royal Inniskilling Fusiliers (left February 1918)
- 1st Battalion, Border Regiment
- 87th Machine Gun Company (formed 16 February 1916, moved to 29th Battalion M.G.C. on 15 Feb 1918)
- 87th Trench Mortar Battery (formed 28 April 1916)

=== 88th Brigade ===
- 4th Battalion, Worcestershire Regiment
- 2nd Battalion, Hampshire Regiment
- 1st Battalion, Essex Regiment (left February 1918)
- 1/5th (Queen's Edinburgh Rifles) Battalion, Royal Scots Territorial Force (T.F.) (joined March left July 1915)
- 2/1st (City of London) Battalion, London Regiment (T.F.) (joined August 1915, left January 1916)
- 1st Battalion, Royal Newfoundland Regiment (joined 20 September 1915, left May 1918)
- 2nd Battalion, Prince of Wales's Leinster Regiment (Royal Canadians) (joined April 1918)
- 88th Machine Gun Company (formed 21 February 1916, moved to 29th Battalion M.G.C. on 15 Feb 1918)
- 88th Trench Mortar Battery (formed 16 April 1916)

=== Divisional Troops ===
- 1/2nd (T.F.) Battalion, Monmouthshire Regiment (Pioneers) (joined May 1916)
- 29th Divisional Train Army Service Corps (A.S.C.)
  - 246th, 247th, 248th and 249th (T.F.) Companies, A.S.C. (joined from the 43rd (Wessex) Division, transferred to 53rd (Welsh) Division in March 1916)
  - 225th, 226th, 227th and 228th Companies, A.S.C. (joined 24 March 1916)
- 18th Mobile Veterinary Section Army Veterinary Corps
- 226th Divisional Employment Company (joined on 25 May 1917)
- Divisional Mounted Troops
  - C Sqn, the Surrey Yeomanry (left 11 May 1916)
  - No. 1 Section, 10th Squadron, Royal Naval Armoured Car Detachment (attached between 5 May 20 June 1915)

=== Royal Artillery ===
- XV Brigade, Royal Horse Artillery
  - B Battery, RHA
  - L Battery, RHA
  - Y Battery, RHA (left for 1st Cavalry Division on 27 November 1916)
  - 369th Battery, RFA (joined 31 March, left 20 May 1916
  - 460th (Howitzer) Battery, R.F.A (joined 12 September 1916)
  - 1/1st Warwickshire Battery, RHA (T.F.) (joined 27 November 1916)
  - XV RHA Brigade Ammunition Column
- XVIII Brigade Royal Field Artillery (R.F.A.)
- CXLVII Brigade R.F.A. (left January 1917)
- IV Highland (Mountain) Brigade, Royal Garrison Artillery (left July 1915)
- CXXXII Brigade R.F.A. (joined 2 March 1916 broken up 4 February 1918)
- 29th Divisional Ammunition Column R.F.A. (remained in Salonika, replaced by 53rd (Welsh) Division's column in France)

=== Royal Engineers ===
- 2nd Lowland Field Company (left February 1916)
- 510th Field Company (renamed from 2nd London Field Company)
- 455th Field Company (renamed from 1st West Riding Field Company)
- 497th Field Company (joined February 1916, renamed from 3rd Kent Field Company)
- 1st London Divisional Signal Company

=== Royal Army Medical Corps ===
- 87th (1st West Lancashire) Field Ambulance
- 88th (1st East Anglian) Field Ambulance
- 89th (1st Highland) Field Ambulance
- 16th Sanitary Section (left April 1917)

== Battles ==
The Division participated in the following engagements:

- Gallipoli campaign
  - Landing at Cape Helles
  - First Battle of Krithia
  - Second Battle of Krithia
  - Third Battle of Krithia
  - Battle of Gully Ravine
  - Battle of Sari Bair
    - Battle of Krithia Vineyard
    - Battle of Scimitar Hill
- Battle of the Somme (1916)
- Third Battle of Ypres
- Battle of Cambrai
- Fourth Battle of Ypres
- Fifth Battle of Ypres
- Battle of Courtrai (1918)

== Commanders ==
- Major-General Frederick Shaw (18 January − 10 March 1915)
- Major-General Aylmer Hunter-Weston (10 March – 24 May 1915)
- Major-General Henry de Beauvoir de Lisle (24 May – 15 August 1915)

- Temporary: Major-General William Marshall (15 August – 24 August 1915)

- Major-General Henry de Beauvoir de Lisle (24 August 1915 – 12 March 1918)

- Acting: Brigadier-General R. M. Johnson (12 March – 19 March 1918)

- Major-General Douglas Edward Cayley (19 March – 10 August 1918)

- Acting: Brigadier-General H. H. S. Knox (10 August – 25 August 1918)

- Major-General Douglas Edward Cayley (25 August 1918 – March 1919)

== The Diamond Troupe ==
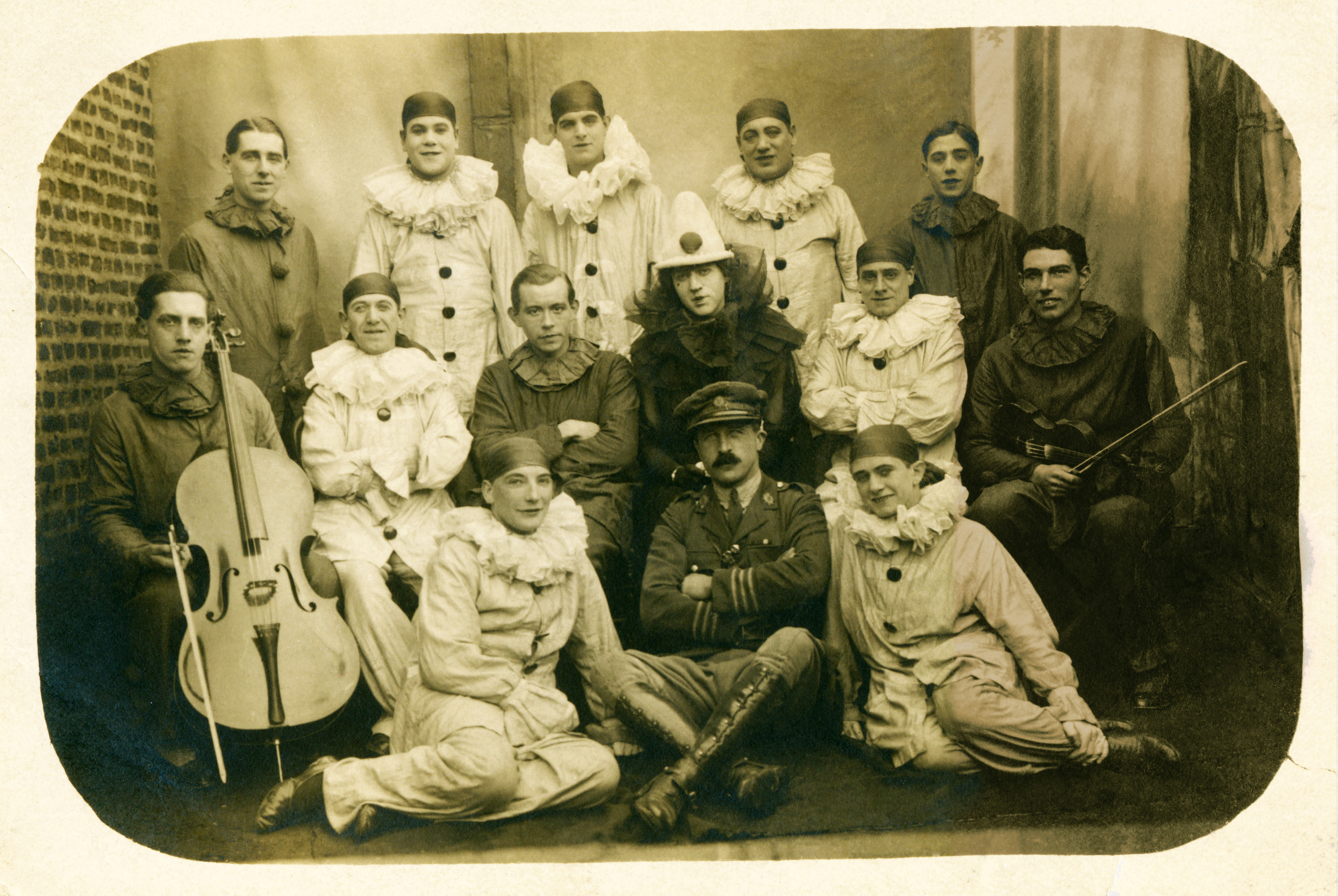
The Diamond Troupe, Concert Party of the 29th Division

The Diamond Troupe was the Concert Party of the 29th Division. The Diamond Troupe was one of a small number of concert parties to achieve considerable notoriety, both on the battlefield and at home. The members of the troupe were: Front row (from left to right): Pte. Eric John Dean, Lt. Col. E. Trevor Wright, Pte. Lawrence Nicol. Middle row: Pte. Hubert Holmes (cellist), Corp. Frank Pollard, L. Cp. Robert James Stannard, Pte. William Threlfall, Pte. Arthur Sykes, Pte. H. Palmer (violinist). Back row: Pte. Neville Giordano, Pte. Jock McKinley, Pte. Alexander Hill, Pte. George Hangle, Pte. J. Morris.

== See also ==
- List of British divisions in World War I
