= George Moor =

Recipient of the Victoria Cross

George Raymond Dallas Moor
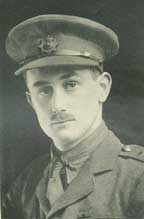
- Born: 22 October 1896; St Kilda, Victoria, Australia
- Died: 3 November 1918 (aged 22); Mouvaux, France
- Burial place: Y Farm Military Cemetery, Bois-Grenier, France
- Military career
- Allegiance: United Kingdom
- Branch: British Army
- Service years: 1914–1918
- Rank: Lieutenant
- Units: Royal Hampshire Regiment
- Conflicts: First World War: Gallipoli campaign
- Awards: Victoria Cross; Military Cross & Bar

George Raymond Dallas Moor, VC, MC & Bar (22 October 1896 – 3 November 1918) was a recipient of the Victoria Cross, the highest award for gallantry in the face of the enemy that can be awarded to British and Commonwealth forces. He was awarded the Victoria Cross for stemming a rout by shooting four of his own soldiers during the Gallipoli campaign in 1915.

== Early life ==
Moor was born 22 October 1896, in his mother's sister's home in Pollington Street, St Kilda, Australia. He was the son of William Henry Moor (Auditor-General, Transvaal, retired) and Mrs. Moor, and nephew of the late Sir Ralph Moor, formerly High Commissioner for Southern Nigeria. He was educated at Cheltenham College.

== First World War ==
After briefly serving as a private in the 21st (Service) Battalion, Royal Fusiliers (4th Public Schools), Moor was commissioned into the 3rd (Reserve) Battalion, Hampshire Regiment (later the Royal Hampshire Regiment) in October 1914, and was later granted a commission in the Regular Army on 1 August 1915. After six months' training in England and Egypt, he went with the 2nd Battalion of his regiment to the Dardanelles, and was at the landing at V Beach at Gallipoli on 25 April 1915.

His Victoria Cross was gazetted on 24 July 1915, when he was still only 18 years of age. The citation read:

For most conspicuous bravery and resource on the 5th June, 1915, during operations South of Krithia, Dardanelles. When a detachment of a battalion on his left, which had lost all its officers, was rapidly retiring before a heavy Turkish attack, 2nd Lieutenant Moor immediately grasping the danger to the remainder of the line, dashed back some two hundred yards, stemmed the retirement, led back the men, and recaptured the lost trench. This young officer who only joined the Army in October, 1914, by his personal bravery and presence of mind saved a dangerous situation.

Lieutenant General Sir Beauvoir de Lisle, in a narrative of Moor's VC action, said, "I have often quoted this young Officer as being one of the bravest men I have met in this War."

Moor was invalided home soon afterwards suffering from dysentery. After recovering he joined the 1st Battalion in France and was badly wounded in the arm. He returned to England, and before regaining the use of his arm was appointed Aide-de-Camp to Major General W. de L. Williams in France, where he gained the Military Cross and Bar. Moor was promoted lieutenant on 30 October 1916.

His Military Cross citation, gazetted 2 December 1918, reads:

Lieutenant George Raymond Dallas Moor, V.C., Hampshire Regiment. For conspicuous gallantry and skill. He carried out a daylight reconnaissance all along the divisional front in face of heavy machine-gun fire at close range, in many places well in front of our foremost posts.

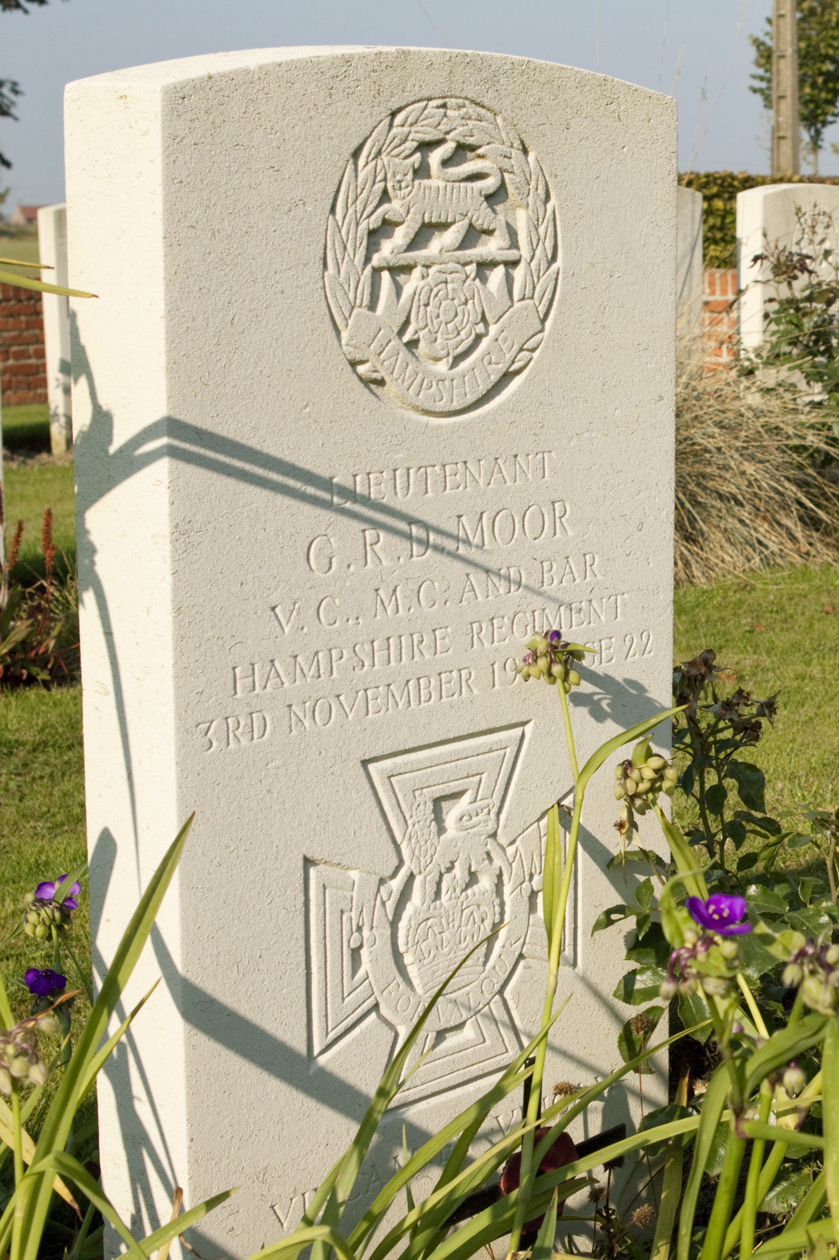
Moor's CWGC gravestone

The award of a Bar to his Military Cross was promulgated on 29 July 1919, reading:

On October 20th, 1918, near to Pijpestraat, the vanguard commander was wounded and unable to carry on. Owing to heavy shelling and machine-gun fire, the vanguard came to a standstill. Lieut. Moor, Acting General Staff Officer, who was reconnoitring the front, noticed this; he immediately took charge, and by his fearless example and skilful leading continued the advance until the objective was reached. He has a positive contempt for danger, and distinguishes himself on every occasion.

Moor died of Spanish influenza at Mouvaux, France, on 3 November 1918. He is buried in the Y Farm Military Cemetery, Bois-Grenier, which is cared for by the Commonwealth War Graves Commission. The inscription on his gravestone reads: VINCAM ET VINCAM. A copy of his VC is displayed at the Royal Hampshire Regiment Museum in Winchester, England.

== Bibliography ==
- Snelling, Stephen (2012) [1995]. Gallipoli. VCs of the First World War. The History Press. ISBN 978-0752456539.
