= Alçıtepe =

- Village
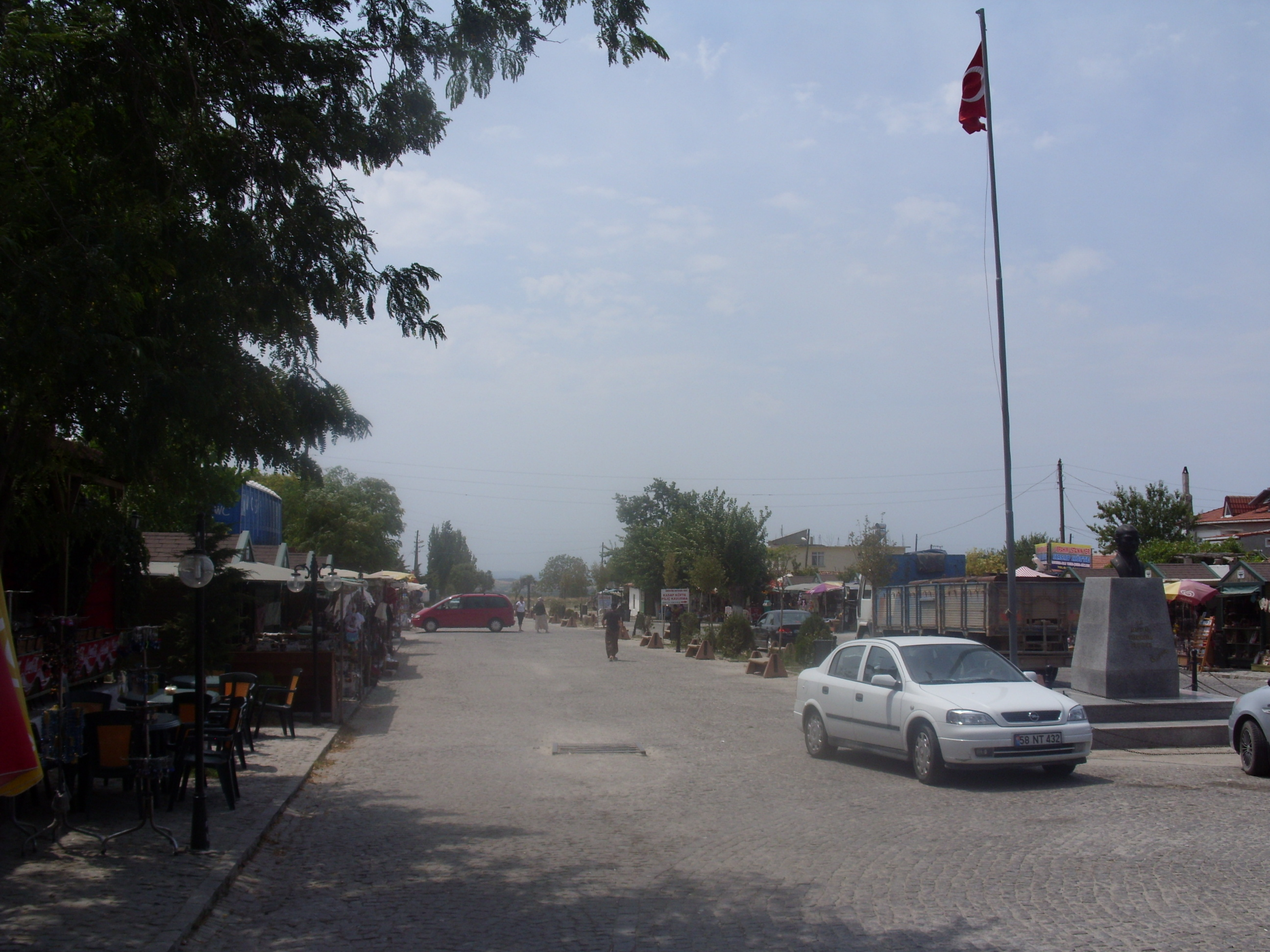

- Location within Turkey Location within Marmara
- Coordinates: 40°06′N 26°13′E
- Country: Turkey
- Province: Çanakkale
- District: Eceabat
- Population (2021): 433
- Time zone: UTC+3 (TRT)
- Area code: 0286

Alçıtepe, also known by its former name, Krithia (Greek: Κριθία), is a small village in Turkey on a commanding high plateau, about 4 miles from Cape Helles, the tip of the Thracian Chersonesos, now Gallipoli Peninsula. It is part of the Eceabat District of Çanakkale Province. Its population is 433 (2021).

Krithia was named after the grain "krithos", which in Greek means "barley"; a nearby cape was also called Krithea (Κριθέα) in Byzantine times, now Akbaş Burnu. In the Book of Navigation of the Ottoman admiral Piri Reis (1521), it is recorded as Kirte.

At the turn of the 20th century, about 450 Greek families lived in the village. In October 1914, a military mission arrived at the village. Turkish soldiers with fixed bayonets surrounded the village and forced the evacuation of each house in turn. Then, under the eyes of their officers, they seized everything they could lay their hands on. Stripped of everything they possessed, the inhabitants in despair had to seek refuge in Madytos.

During the Gallipoli campaign, the village was an objective of the first day of the landing at Cape Helles on 25 April 1915; it was never reached. Over the following months, Ottoman defenders successfully repulsed several assaults by Allied troops. More famously, the village was the site of the Battle of Krithia during the same campaign.

As a result, the settlement suffered extensive damage due to shelling: the two Greek churches were destroyed, and only few traces of its medieval and ancient past remain, such as a column in the village square or architectural elements reused as spolia. Following the departure of the Greek population in the Greco-Turkish population exchange, the village was resettled with Turks from Bulgaria in 1938.

== Sources ==
- "Krithia". Australian War Memorial.
- First Battle of Krithia
