= Beauvoir De Lisle =

British Army general (1864–1955)

General Sir Beauvoir De Lisle KCB KCMG DSO
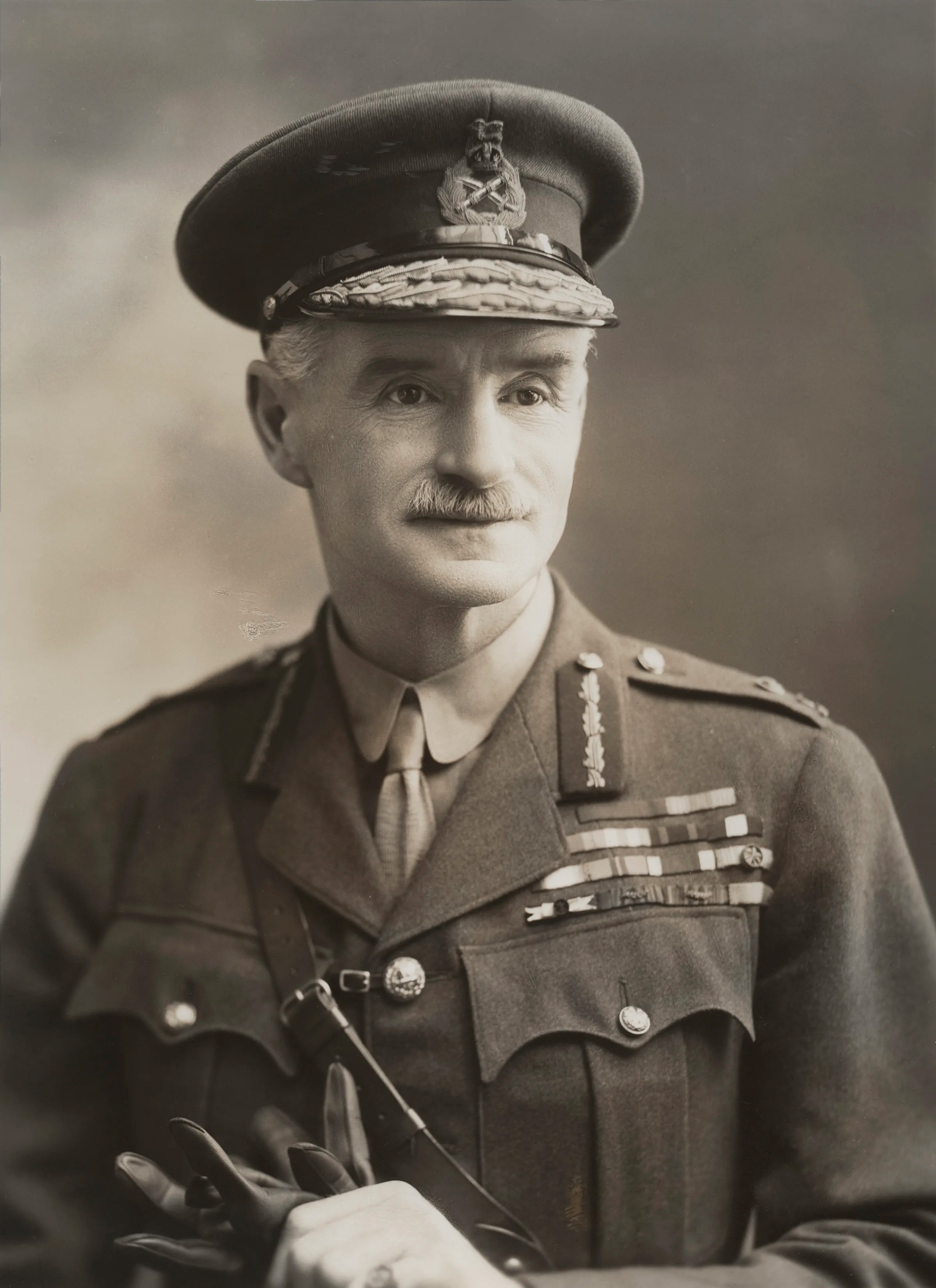
- De Lisle in 1919
- Born: 27 July 1864; Guernsey
- Died: 16 July 1955 (aged 90)
- Military career
- Allegiance: United Kingdom
- Branch: British Army
- Service years: 1883–1926
- Rank: General
- Unit: Durham Light Infantry
- Commands: Western Command (1919–1923); XV Corps (1918); XIII Corps (1918); 29th Division (1915–1918); 1st Cavalry Division (1914–1915); 2nd Cavalry Brigade (1911, 1914); 1st (Royal) Dragoons (1906–1910)
- Conflicts: Second Boer War; First World War
- Awards: Knight Commander of the Order of the Bath; Knight Commander of the Order of St Michael and St George; Distinguished Service Order; Mentioned in Despatches

General Sir Henry de Beauvoir De Lisle, KCB, KCMG, DSO (27 July 1864 – 16 July 1955), known as Beauvoir De Lisle, was a British Army officer and sportsman. He served in both the Second Boer War and the First World War, where he commanded the 29th Division for nearly three years, leading it in the Gallipoli campaign and later at the Battle of the Somme, before taking over the command of a corps.

== Early military career ==
Born in Guernsey and educated in Jersey, De Lisle was, after graduating from the Royal Military College at Sandhurst, commissioned into the 2nd Battalion of the Durham Light Infantry (DLI) in March 1883. He saw service with the mounted infantry in Egypt between 1885 and 1886, being awarded the Distinguished Service Order (DSO). In December 1885, a day after the Battle of Ginnis against the Mahdist State, he led a patrol which attacked a nuggar barge on which a widow of a Mahdist Sheik was trying to escape the area with her son. The mother and her year old son were separated and the troops found the child alone near a river barge on the Nile. The regiment adopted the boy, christening him James Francis Durham, after two soldiers and the regiment itself. Jimmy Durham was raised within the battalion and went on to become first soldier of African descent in the British Army.

De Lisle was promoted to the rank of lieutenant in March 1887 and captain on 1 October 1891.

De Lisle studied at the Staff College, Camberley in 1899. After the outbreak of the Second Boer War in late 1899, he was appointed in command of the Australian Brigade, with the local rank of lieutenant colonel from 30 January 1900. The brigade was a mobile column comprising the 6th Battalion, Mounted Infantry, the West Australian Mounted Infantry, the South Australian Imperial Bushmen and the New South Wales Mounted Rifles. Most of these units followed him when in April 1900 he was appointed in command of the 2nd Corps of Mounted Infantry, part of the 1st Mounted Infantry Brigade under overall command by Major General Edward Hutton. This force was actively engaged both during Lord Roberts's advance from Bloemfontein and after the fall of Pretoria, and he took part in the Battle of Diamond Hill (June 1900). He was severely wounded and three times mentioned in dispatches. Promotion to major came on 1 January 1902, and to the brevet rank of lieutenant colonel on the following day. During the early months of 1902 his brigade was stationed in Natal, but in April he left the command of this brigade and transferred to Transvaal where there was more intense fighting. He left Cape Town for the United Kingdom in late May 1902. In a despatch dated 23 June 1902, Lord Kitchener, who had been commander-in-chief (C-in-C) during the latter part of the war, described De Lisle as "an officer of remarkable force of character. He has soldierly qualities and is a fine leader." For his service he was appointed a Companion of the Order of the Bath (CB) on 21 August 1902, and received the actual decoration from King Edward VII at Buckingham Palace on 24 October 1902.

After his return he formally transferred to the cavalry when he was commissioned as a major in the 5th (Princess Charlotte of Wales's) Dragoon Guards on 22 October 1902. Later the same year he was appointed in command of the 2nd Provisional Regiment of Hussars at Hounslow. De Lisle was appointed second-in-command of the 1st (Royal) Dragoons in 1903 and then became commanding officer (CO) of the regiment in 1906, after being promoted to lieutenant colonel in February. He was promoted to brevet colonel in August.

After serving on half-pay from February 1910, he was promoted to colonel, and succeeded Colonel Alexander Godley as general staff officer, grade 1 (GSO1) of the 2nd Division at Aldershot from March 1910. Upon relinquishing this assignment, in August 1911 he was promoted to the temporary rank of brigadier general and was appointed commander of the 2nd Cavalry Brigade.

== First World War ==
He served in the First World War, still as commander of the 2nd Cavalry Brigade, which he led overseas on the Western Front, which he led at the First Battle of the Aisne.

Then, after being promoted to temporary major general in October 1914, he was general officer commanding of the 1st Cavalry Division, his former brigade's parent formation, taking over from Edmund Allenby.

De Lisle, his rank of major general having been made substantive in February 1915, remained in command of the division until he became GOC 29th Division, leading the division at the Third Battle of Krithia during the Gallipoli campaign of April 1915 to January 1916. He briefly and temporarily led IX Corps during the campaign.

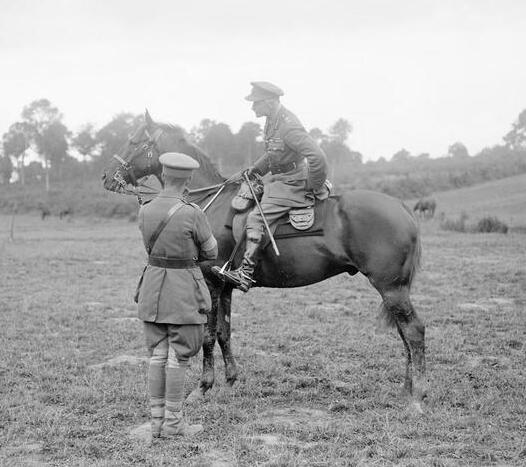
Major-General Beauvoir De Lisle (on horseback), GOC 29th Division, in conversation with another senior officer, Mailly-Maillet, France, 29 June 1916.

After the evacuation of Allied forces from Gallipoli in early 1916, De Lisle's and his division was sent to Egypt, where it remained for the next few weeks. In March it was transferred to the Western Front, the main theatre of war, in March 1916, where they joined the rest of the British Expeditionary Force.

De Lisle led the 29th Division at the Battle of the Somme, which began on 1 July. During the battle, the 1st Battalion, Newfoundland Regiment (later the Royal Newfoundland Regiment), which formed part of the 29th Division, suffered particularly heavy casualties, prompting De Lisle to later pay tribute to the regiment's bravery:

It was a magnificent display of trained and disciplined valour, and its assault only failed of success because dead men can advance no further.

The quote has become a notable epitaph to the sacrifices made by the regiment during the battle.

The division's next major engagement after the fighting on the Somme came in April 1917 during the Battle of Arras, where it served under General Sir Edmund Allenby's Third Army of the BEF.

De Lisle was a tough commander and man, although not an especially popular one. He was one of three divisional GOCs, along with Major General Philip Robertson, GOC 17th (Northern) Division, and Major General Percival Wilkinson, GOC 50th (Northumbrian) Division, who, during the Arras fighting, risked their careers by protesting directly to Field Marshal Sir Douglas Haig, commander-in-chief (C-in-C) of the BEF and Allenby's direct superior, about the latter's handling of the Third Army, under whose command all three divisions were serving in. The three men expressed concerns over inadequate artillery support, poor coordination, and unrealistic objectives, which they believed contributed to significant casualties (particularly in the 50th Division) and hindered progress. This bold stance, demonstrating De Lisle's willingness to speak truth to those in power, ultimately reinforced Haig's decision to relieve Allenby of command of the Third Army and replace him with Lieutenant General Sir Julian Byng, whom De Lisle knew well.

After being appointed a Knight Commander of the Order of the Bath (KCB) in January 1917, he was promoted to the temporary rank of lieutenant general in March 1918, becoming GOC XIII Corps before being reassigned to command XV Corps in April, leading it in the final months of the war and to the Armistice of 11 November 1918, which ended hostilities.

== Post-war ==
After the war he was promoted to the permanent rank of lieutenant-general, in January 1919, and in October was appointed to succeed Lieutenant General Sir Thomas Snow as general officer commanding-in-chief (GOC-in-C) of Western Command. He held this post until 1923 and then retired from the army in October 1926, after being promoted to general in January.

== Retirement ==
De Lisle was made colonel of his old regiment, the Durham Light Infantry, in October 1928, in succession to Major General Sir Frederick Robb.

He was known for his polo skills and spent much of the years 1929 to 1930 training polo teams for the Maharaja of Kashmir in India.

He died shortly before his 91st birthday in July 1955.

== Family ==
De Lisle married on 16 July 1902, at Stoke Poges church, Leila Annette Bryant, daughter of Wilberforce Bryant, of Stoke Park, Buckinghamshire (the proprietor of Bryant and May, matchmakers).

== Bibliography ==
- Reminiscences of sport and war by Beauvoir De Lisle, Eyre & Spottiswoode, 1939
- Tournament Polo by Beauvoir De Lisle, Charles Scribner's Sons, 1938
- Polo in India by Beauvoir De Lisle, Thacker, 1907

Military offices
Preceded by Aylmer Hunter-Weston	GOC 29th Division; 1915–1918	Succeeded by Douglas Edward Cayley
Preceded by John Du Cane	GOC XV Corps; April–November 1918	Post disbanded
Preceded by Sir Thomas Snow	GOC-in-C Western Command; 1919–1923	Succeeded by Sir John Du Cane
Honorary titles
Preceded by Sir Frederick Robb	Colonel of the Durham Light Infantry; 1928–1934	Succeeded by Charles Luard
