= First Battle of Krithia =

Battle in Gallipoli during the First World War

Coordinates: 40.0431°N 26.1753°E

- Part of the First World War
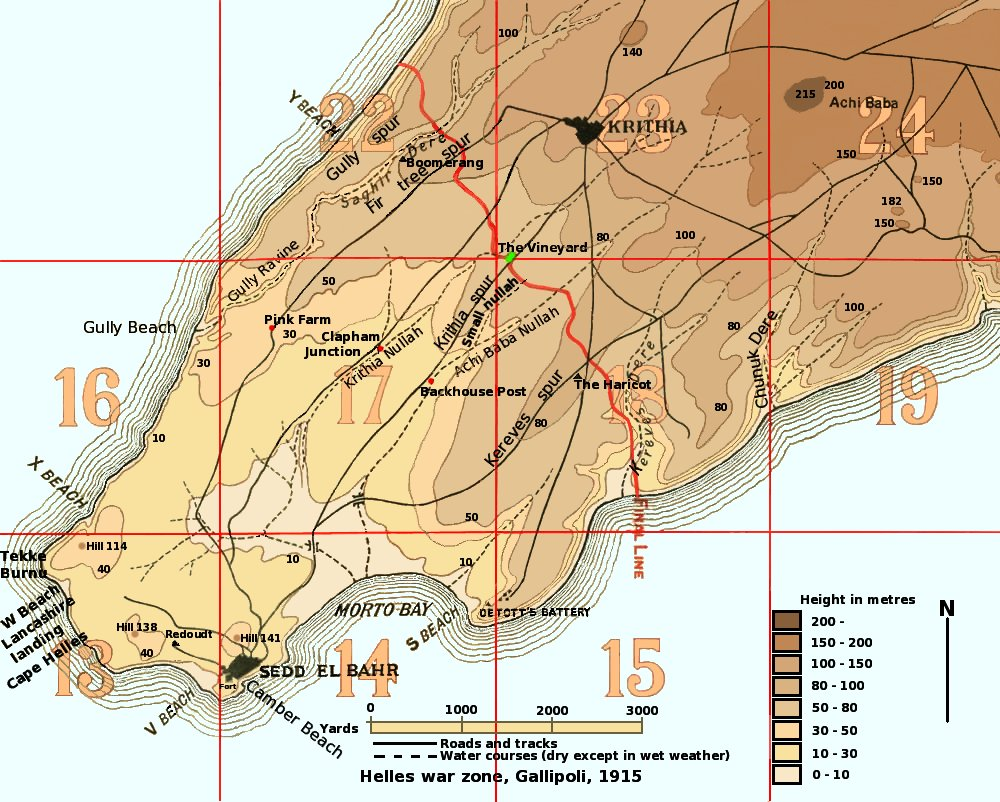
- Map of the Helles front in 1915
Date	28 April 1915
Location	Helles, Gallipoli, Adrianople Vilayet, Ottoman Empire
Result	Ottoman victory

Belligerents
British Empire; France	Ottoman Empire

Commanders and leaders
(United Kingdom of Great Britain and Ireland) Aylmer Hunter-Weston	(Ottoman Empire) Halil Sami Bey

Strength
19 battalions, 13,500 men	9 battalions

Casualties and losses
British: c. 2,000 killed French: 1,001 killed	2,378 killed

The First Battle of Krithia (Turkish: Birinci Kirte Muharebesi) was the first Allied attempt to advance in the Battle of Gallipoli during the First World War. Starting on 28 April, three days after the Landing at Cape Helles, the defensive power of the Ottoman forces quickly overwhelmed the attack, which suffered from poor leadership and planning, lack of communications, and exhausted and demoralised troops.

== Prelude ==
On the morning of 25 April 1915, the 29th Division (Major General Aylmer Hunter-Weston), landed on five beaches around Cape Helles at the southern tip of the Gallipoli peninsula in the Ottoman Empire. The main landings at 'V' and 'W' Beaches were hotly contested and the British suffered heavy casualties. A supporting landing made at 'Y' Beach on the Aegean coast to the north was made without opposition but the troops were without instructions and made no attempt to either advance or dig in. The first-day objectives of the village of Krithia and the nearby hill of Achi Baba were virtually undefended. The British forfeited an opportunity for an early success when they were forced to retreat from 'Y' Beach when the Ottoman reinforcements arrived.

After much fighting, the British were able to secure the main landings. After a diversionary landing at Kum Kale on the Asian shore of the Dardanelles, the French Corps expéditionnaire d'Orient moved across the straits to Helles and took over the right of the Allied line. By the afternoon of 27 April, the Allies were able to make an advance of about 2 miles (3.2 km) up the peninsula towards Krithia, ready for an assault on the following day. The success of the Ottoman defence of the beaches led the British to grossly overestimate the opposition they faced. The Ottomans were outnumbered 3:1 but believing that the Ottomans were indifferent fighters, the British assumed they were faced by two divisions, rather than two understrength regiments fighting a delaying action.

== Battle ==
The battle commenced around 8:00 a.m. on 28 April with a naval bombardment. The plan of advance was for the French to hold position on the right while the British line would pivot, capturing Krithia and assailing Achi Baba from the south and west. The overly-complex plan was poorly communicated to the brigade and battalion commanders of the 29th Division who would make the attack. Hunter-Weston remained far from the front; because of this, he was not able to exert any control as the attack developed. The initial advances were easy but as pockets of Ottoman resistance were encountered, some stretches of the line were held up while others kept moving, thereby becoming outflanked. As the troops advanced further up the peninsula, the terrain became more difficult as they encountered the four great ravines that ran from the heights around Achi Baba towards the cape.

On the extreme left, the British ran into Gully Ravine which was as wild and confusing as the ground at Anzac Cove. Two battalions of the 87th Brigade (1st Border Regiment and 1st Royal Inniskilling Fusiliers) entered the ravine but were halted by a machine gun post near 'Y' Beach. No further advance would be made up the ravine until the 1/6th Gurkha Rifles captured the post on the night of 12/13 May. This involved them going up a 300-foot (91 m) vertical slope, upon which the Royal Marine Light Infantry and the Royal Dublin Fusiliers had previously been defeated. The site became known as 'Gurkha Bluff'. The exhausted, demoralised and virtually leaderless British troops could go no further in the face of stiffening Ottoman resistance. In some places, Ottoman counter-attacks drove the British back to their starting positions. By 6:00 p.m. the attack was called off.

== Aftermath ==
About 14,000 Allied troops participated in the battle and suffered 2,000 British and 1,001 French casualties. The scale and duration of the battle was minor compared to later fighting but the First Battle of Krithia was one of the most significant of the campaign as it proved that the original British assumption of a swift victory over an indifferent enemy was mistaken. Helles became the scene of numerous attrition battles, in which success would be measured by an advance of 100 yd (91 m) or the capture of a trench.
