= Cape Helles =

Rocky headland in Turkey

Coordinates: 40.0431°N 26.1753°E

- Headland
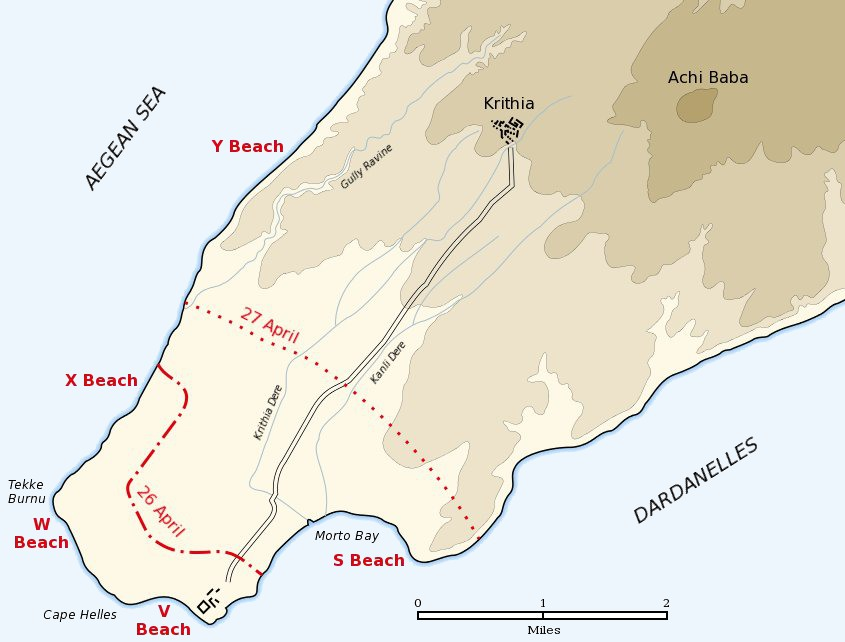
- Cape Helles landing beaches
- Location: Gallipoli Peninsula, Aegean Sea, Turkey

Cape Helles is the rocky headland at the southwesternmost tip of the Gallipoli peninsula, Turkey. It was the scene of heavy fighting between Ottoman Turkish and British troops during the landing at Cape Helles at the beginning of the Gallipoli campaign in 1915. The name derives from the mythical Greek princess Helle who drowned in the Hellespont; 'Helles' is genitive of 'Helle' in the ancient Greek language.

The Helles Memorial is a British and Commonwealth battle memorial for the whole Gallipoli campaign. It lists all units that served on the peninsula during the campaign including the Australian and New Zealand units that served in the Anzac sector and all units that served in the Suvla Bay sector.

The Helles Memorial also commemorates the names of all United Kingdom and Indian forces who died anywhere on the peninsula and have no known grave. Australians who died in the Helles sector are commemorated on the Helles Memorial and are not commemorated on the Lone Pine Memorial. Over 20,000 names are commemorated on the Helles Memorial which is maintained by the Commonwealth War Graves Commission.
