= George Samson =

Scottish Victoria Cross recipient in WWI

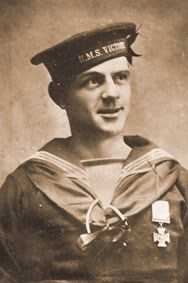
- Samson c. 1917
- Born: 7 January 1889; Carnoustie, Forfarshire, Scotland
- Died: 28 February 1923 (aged 34); Aboard the SS Strombus
- Burial place: Methodist Cemetery, St. George's, Bermuda
- Military career
- Allegiance: United Kingdom
- Branch: Royal Navy
- Rank: Petty officer
- Units: HMS Hussar; SS River Clyde
- Conflicts: World War I
- Awards: Victoria Cross; Médaille militaire (France)
- Other work: Merchant seaman

George McKenzie Samson VC (7 January 1889 – 28 February 1923) was a Scottish recipient of the Victoria Cross, the highest and most prestigious award for gallantry in the face of the enemy that can be awarded to British and Commonwealth forces, for his actions during the Gallipoli Campaign of the First World War. Samson was from Carnoustie in Angus, 26 years old, and a seaman in the Royal Naval Reserve when he was awarded the VC.

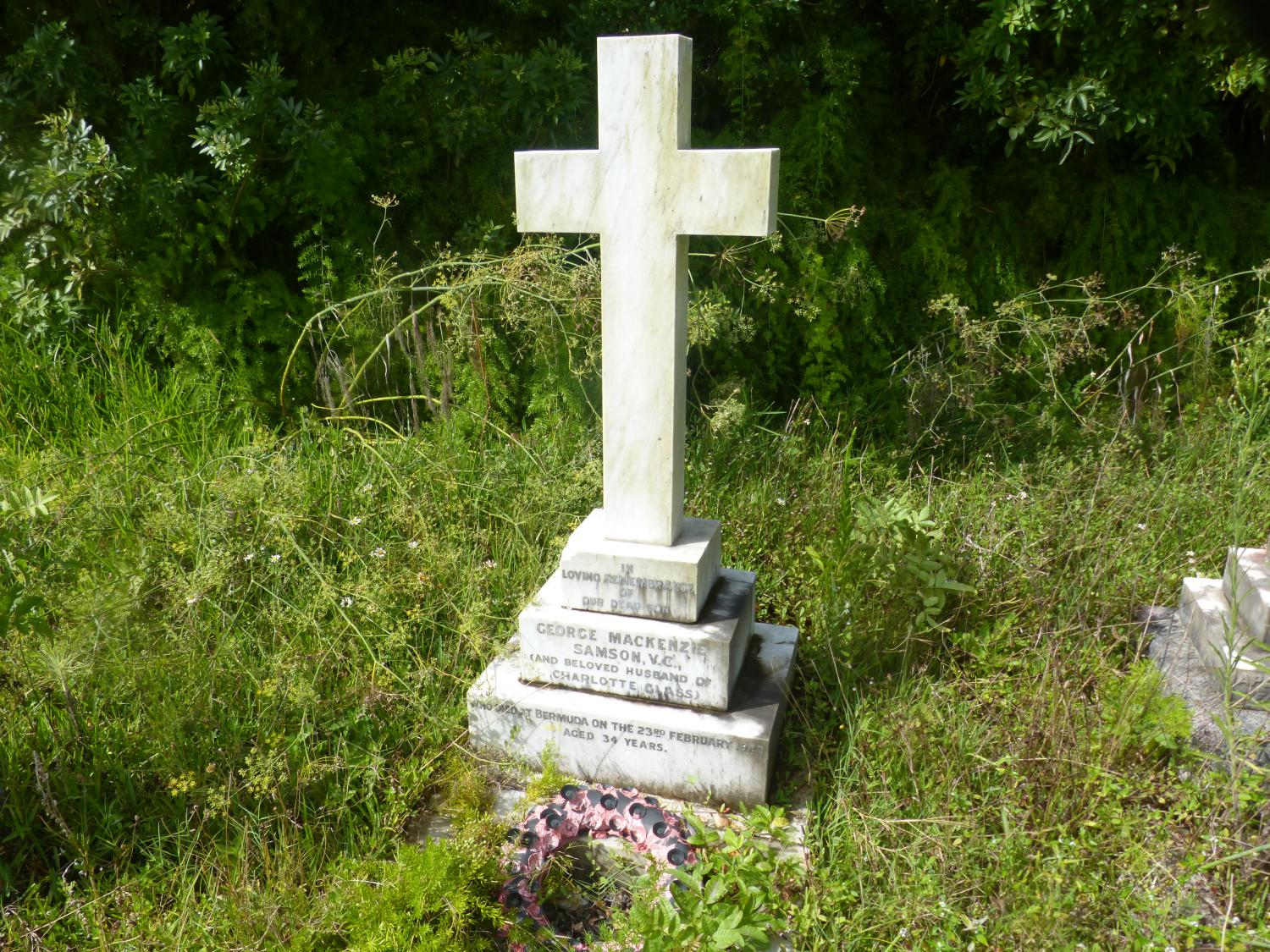
George MacKenzie Samson's grave in Bermuda

On 25 April 1915 during the landing at V Beach on Cape Helles, Seaman Samson, along with three other men (George Leslie Drewry, Wilfred St. Aubyn Malleson, and William Charles Williams) was assisting the commander (Edward Unwin) of their ship HMS River Clyde, at the work of securing the lighters. He worked all day under very heavy fire, attending wounded and getting out lines. He was eventually seriously wounded by Maxim fire.

While dressed in civilian clothes and on his way to a public reception in his honour, Samson was given a white feather.

He later achieved the rank of petty officer and rejoined the Merchant Navy after the war, ultimately dying of pneumonia. He is buried in the new St. George's Military Cemetery off Secretary Lane in St. George's, Bermuda. His VC is in the Lord Ashcroft Gallery in the Imperial War Museum in London.

== Bibliography ==
- Snelling, Stephen (2012) [1995]. Gallipoli. VCs of the First World War. The History Press. ISBN 978-0752456539.
