= Frank Harvey (cricketer) =

English cricketer, clergyman and educator

Personal information
- Full name: Frank Northam Harvey
- Born: 19 December 1864; Southampton, Hampshire, England
- Died: 10 November 1939 (aged 74); Southampton, Hampshire, England
- Batting: Right-handed
- Role: Wicket-keeper
- Relatives: Godfrey Harvey (son)

Domestic team information
- Years: Team
- 1899–1900: Hampshire

Career statistics
Competition	First-class
Matches	3
Runs scored	20
Batting average	5.00
100s/50s	–/–
Top score	7
Catches/stumpings	2/1
- Source: Cricinfo, 2 January 2009

Frank Northam Harvey (19 December 1864 — 10 November 1939) was an English first-class cricketer, clergyman and educator.

The son of The Reverend Aaron Harvey, he was born at Southampton in December 1864. He was educated in Southampton at Handel College, which was run by his father, before matriculating to Exeter College, Oxford. After graduating from Oxford, he took holy orders and undertook his first ecclesiastical duties as curate of St Denys Church in Southampton in 1888. In 1894, he was appointed chaplain at the Royal South Hants Hospital. In 1899, Harvey made his debut in first-class cricket for Hampshire against Derbyshire at Derby in the 1899 County Championship. The following season, he made a further two first-class appearances in the 1900 County Championship, both against Essex. Playing as a wicket-keeper, he took two catches and made a single stumping in his three first-class matches, in addition to scoring 20 runs. He was appointed vicar at Whitchurch, Hampshire in 1910, before being appointed rector of Fawley with Langley in 1924. Alongside his ecclesiastical duties, he was headmaster of Handel College until 1912, having succeeded his father. Harvey died at Southampton in November 1939. His son, Godfrey, was also a first-class cricketer.
