= Blackfield, Hampshire =

Village in England

Coordinates: 50.8184°N 1.3728°W

Blackfield
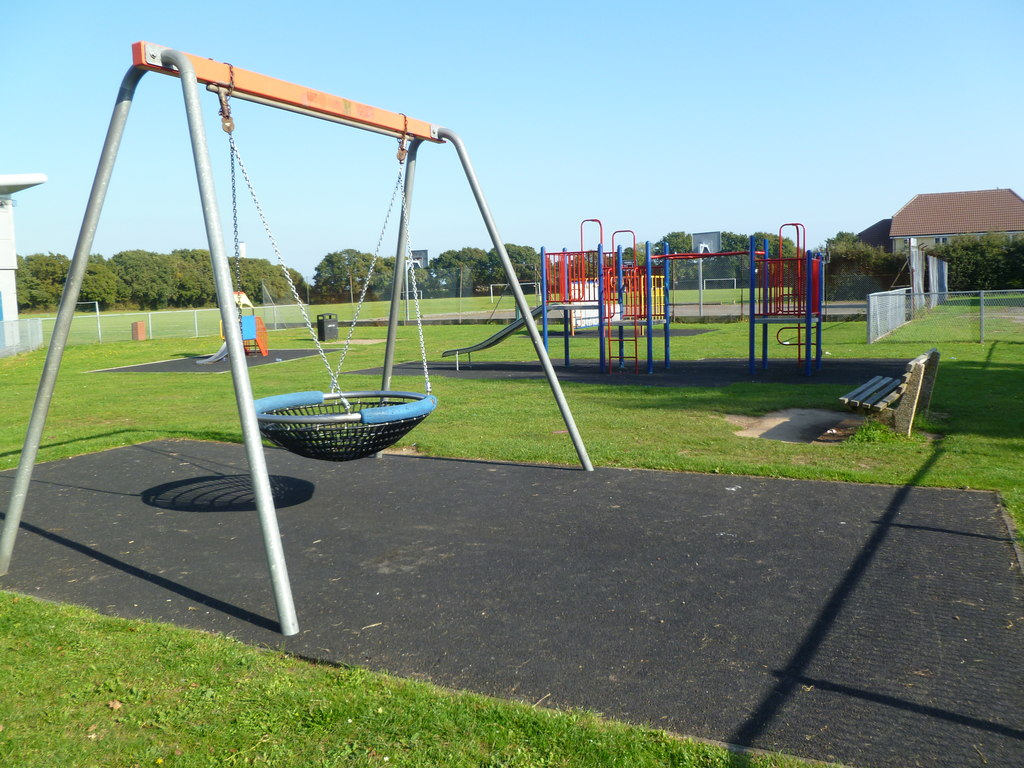
- Blackfield Recreation ground

- Location within Hampshire
- OS grid reference: SU443023
- Civil parish: Fawley
- District: New Forest
- Shire county: Hampshire
- Region: South East
- Country: England
- Sovereign state: United Kingdom
- Post town: SOUTHAMPTON
- Postcode district: SO45
- Dialling code: 023
- Police: Hampshire and Isle of Wight
- Fire: Hampshire and Isle of Wight
- Ambulance: South Central
- UK Parliament: New Forest East

Blackfield is a village in Hampshire, England. It is within the parish of Fawley, which is part of the ward of Fawley, Blackfield and Langley.

== Schools ==
The local school is Blackfield Primary (previously divided into Blackfield Infants, and Blackfield Junior Schools). The catchment secondary school for Blackfield is New Forest Academy.

== History ==
The name "Blackfields" was originally applied to an area of countryside near the village of Fawley, and there is still a Blackwell Common next to Blackfield. The name presumably derives from the soil colour, some of which is marshy and black. The settlement of Blackfield began in the late 19th century when, at first mud cottages, and then later, small red-brick houses were built in the area of moorland once known as Hugh's Common. It was close to the small village of Langley.

== Sport and leisure ==
Blackfield has a Non-League football club Blackfield & Langley F.C., which plays at The Gang Warily Community & Recreation Centre.

In 2020, Hampshire County Council announced plans to close the village library.

== Demographics ==
As of the 2021 United Kingdom census, Blackfield had a population of 5,848. The town is primarily Christians, with 2,748 people declaring their religion as Christianity.
