= Ashlett =

Settlement in Hampshire, England

Coordinates: 50.82°N 01.34°W

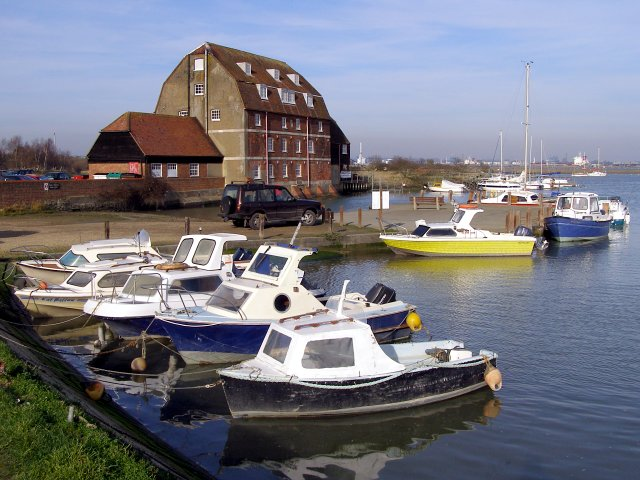
- Victoria Quay and Ashlett Mill

- Location within Hampshire
- OS grid reference: SU465032
- Civil parish: Fawley
- District: New Forest
- Shire county: Hampshire
- Region: South East
- Country: England
- Sovereign state: United Kingdom
- Post town: Southampton
- Postcode district: SO45
- Dialling code: 023
- Police: Hampshire and Isle of Wight
- Fire: Hampshire and Isle of Wight
- Ambulance: South Central
- UK Parliament: New Forest East

Ashlett is a small settlement in Hampshire, England. It is in the civil parish of Fawley. It is at the end of Ashlett Creek, a tidal inlet of Southampton Water. Ashlett is known for having a well-preserved tidal mill (currently a sailing club clubhouse), which is next to a free slipway and landing stage. Although the creek is only accessible at high tide, the historic mill and free landing stage make it a popular destination for dinghy sailors from around Southampton Water.

== Ashlett Creek ==
The name 'Ashlett' may be derived from the Viking custom of planting an ash stave in the ground where their ships first landed and 'flete' from a creek or stretch of salt water.

Ashlett is a natural creek, located down a lane leading from the village of Fawley.

Victoria Quay was built in 1887 to celebrate Queen Victoria's Golden Jubilee and to provide a more efficient way of loading and unloading the barges which came into Ashlett Creek. At the beginning of the 20th century ships of 100, or even 150 tons, were brought up here at high tide, and unloaded at Victoria Quay. It was used extensively to bring in construction materials when the first refinery was built at Fawley in the 1920s.

There was a large mill pond behind Ashlett Mill which once served to regularly clear the silt from the creek. In the early 1990s, there was controversy as the mill pond had an artificial island built at its centre which dramatically reduced the amount of water sluiced through the mill. The creed silt levels have been steadily rising since.

There is a pub at Ashlett called the Jolly Sailor. This was originally a beer house in the days when anyone who paid the poor rate and the two pound excise fee could sell beer.

== Ashlett Mill ==
Ashlett Mill is a brick building with a tiled mansard roof. It was built in 1816, replacing an earlier mill. Milling at the mill stopped in 1902. It served as a meeting and club house of the Waterside Sports and Social Club and the Ashlett Sailing Club until 2019.

== Jolly Sailor ==
Jolly Sailor is a pub currently run by Mark Cox. Built over 150 years ago this staple of the Ashlett brings in cliental from the Fawley Village, located up the hill running straight down into creek.

== Governance ==
The hamlet of Ashlett is part of the civil parish of Fawley, and part of the Fawley, Blackfield and Langley ward of the New Forest council.

== See also ==
- Asclettin, Norman given name
