= Wilfred Malleson =

Wilfred Malleson may refer to:

- Sir Wilfrid Malleson (1866–1946), Major-General in the British Army
- Wilfred St Aubyn Malleson, mMidshipman awarded the Victoria Cross
