= Breen v Amalgamated Engineering Union =

- Court: Court of Appeal
- Citation: [1971] 2 QB 175

Keywords
- Trade union, collective bargaining

Breen v Amalgamated Engineering Union [1971] 2 QB 175 is a UK labour law case, concerning trade union regulation.

== Facts ==
In 1958 Mr Breen was involved in, but absolved from, a dispute on misappropriating union funds. He was voted in as shop steward at his oil refinery in Fawley in 1965, but the district secretary in Southampton who had been party to the 1958 dispute rejected his election. Mr Breen said this was contrary to natural justice.

Cusack J held that rules of natural justice did not apply, and the committee had unfettered discretion under the rules. Only bad faith would suffice, and in any case the old dispute played no part.

== Judgment ==
The Court of Appeal upheld Cusack J, so that Mr Breen's election could be rejected by the union. Edmund Davies LJ could see no authority for overturning the district secretary's decision otherwise. Megaw LJ agreed.

Lord Denning MR, dissenting, said administrative law applies to statutory and also to domestic bodies. He said that administrative law requires that people get fair hearings, and that discretion is only valid when irrelevant factors are not taken into account, even if the body is acting in good faith (decisions are otherwise set aside).

Does all this apply also to a domestic body? I think it does, at any rate when it is a body set up by one of the powerful associations which we see nowadays. Instances are readily to be found in the books, notably the Stock Exchange, the Jockey Club, the Football Association, and innumerable trade unions. All these delegate power to committees. These committees are domestic bodies which control the destinies of thousands.

[...]

Their rules are said to be a contract between the members and the union. So be it. If they are a contract, then it is an implied term that the discretion should be exercised fairly. But the rules are in reality more than a contract. They are a legislative code laid down by the council of the union to be obeyed by the members. This code should be subject to control by the courts just as much as a code laid down by Parliament itself.

[...]

If he is a man who has some right or interest, or some legitimate expectation, of which it would not be fair to deprive him without a hearing, or reasons given, then these should be afforded him, according as the case may demand. The giving of reasons is one of the fundamentals of good administration.

[...]

Seeing that he had been elected to this office by a democratic process, he had, I think, a legitimate expectation that he would be approved by the district committee unless there were good reasons against him. If they had something against him, they ought to tell him and to give him a chance of answering it before turning him down.

== See also ==
- UK labour law
