= William Charles Williams =

British recipient of the Victoria Cross

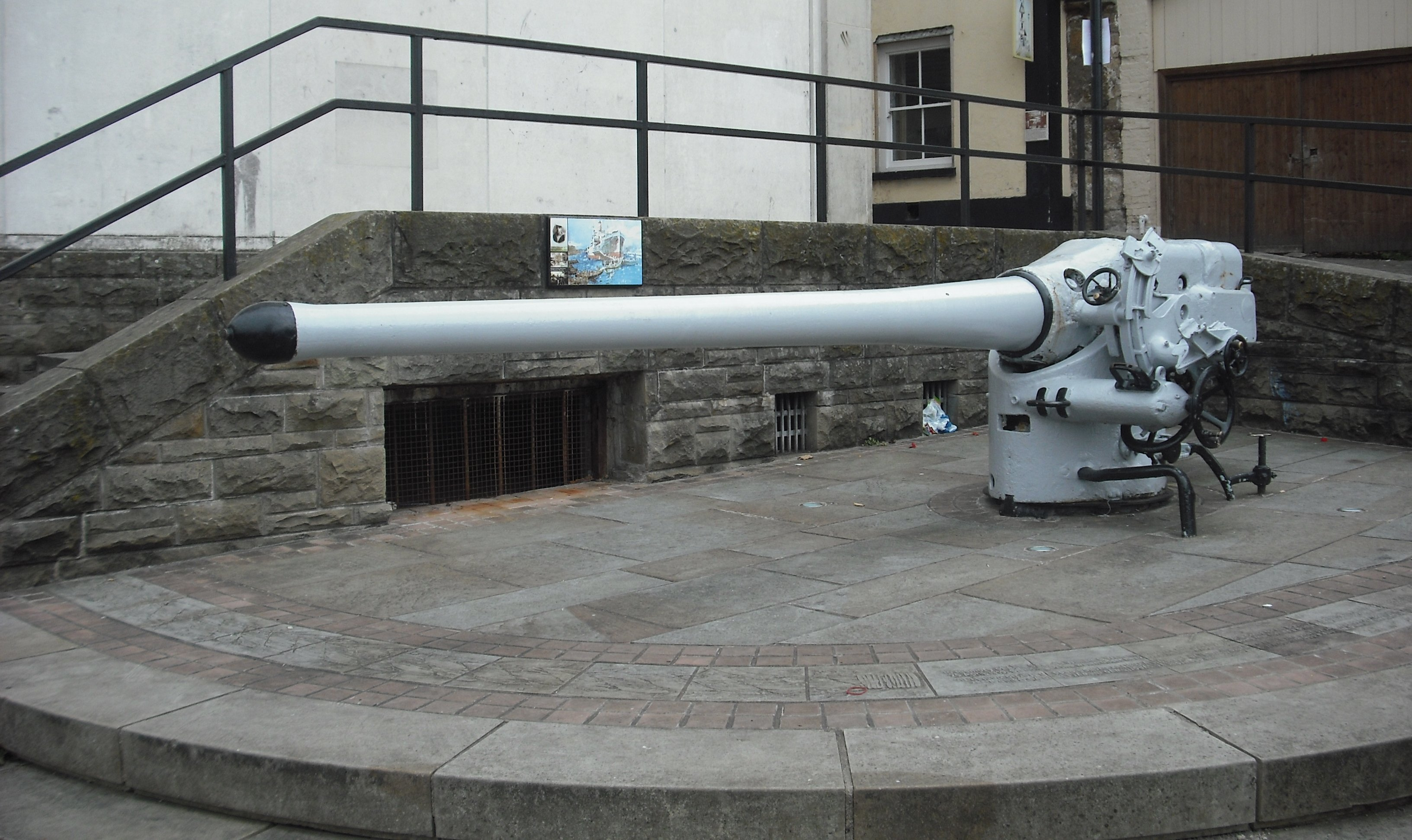
- Deck gun from SM UB-91 as a memorial in Chepstow
- Born: 15 September 1880; Stanton Lacy, Shropshire, England
- Died: 25 April 1915 (aged 34); Cape Helles, Gallipoli, Ottoman Empire
- Military career
- Allegiance: United Kingdom
- Branch: Royal Navy
- Service years: 1895 - 1915
- Rank: Able Seaman
- Units: HMS Hussar; HMS River Clyde
- Conflicts: World War I: Gallipoli campaign; Landing at Cape Helles †
- Awards: Victoria Cross

William Charles Williams VC (15 September 1880 – 25 April 1915) was a British recipient of the Victoria Cross, the highest and most prestigious award for gallantry in the face of the enemy that can be awarded to British and Commonwealth forces.

== Biography ==
Williams was born at Stanton Lacy near Ludlow in Shropshire, England, son of William and his wife Elizabeth Williams. He was raised in Chepstow, Monmouthshire, Wales, to which his parents moved when he was aged seven or eight years.

After employment as a gardener and labourer he joined the Royal Navy Boys Service in Portsmouth in 1895 and was promoted to Boy first class in 1896, Seaman in 1898 and Able Seaman in 1901. He was commended for his bravery when serving aboard HMS Terrible in the Naval Brigade off South Africa during the Second Boer War and in China during the Boxer Rising.

He left the regular service in 1910, joining the Royal Fleet Reserve and working in the police force and in a steel works in Newport. He rejoined the Navy in 1914 on being mobilised at the start of the First World War. During his career, he served on eighteen different ships, some more than once.

== Victoria Cross ==
He was 34 years old when the following deed took place for which he was awarded the VC. On 25 April 1915 during the landing on V Beach, Cape Helles, Gallipoli, Turkey, Williams, with three other men (George Leslie Drewry, Wilfred St. Aubyn Malleson and George McKenzie Samson) was assisting the commander (Edward Unwin) of their ship, HMS River Clyde (previously the SS River Clyde) at the work of securing the lighters. He held on to a rope for over an hour, standing chest deep in the sea, under continuous enemy fire. He was eventually seriously wounded by a shell, later dying whilst his rescue was being effected by the commander who described him as the bravest sailor he had ever met.

== Memorials ==
As he had no known grave he is listed on the Commonwealth War Graves Commission's Portsmouth Naval Memorial.

There are two memorials to him in Chepstow – a painting by Charles Dixon of the events in the Dardanelles, hanging in St Mary's Church; and a naval gun from the German submarine SM UB-91 presented by King George V, which stands in the town's main square beside the war memorial. In Shropshire, a memorial plaque was affixed to the parish war memorial in the churchyard at Stanton Lacy, and following the centenary of his award a VC commemoration stone was erected in the same village, inlaid in the wall near the gate of the village cemetery.
