= Godfrey Harvey =

English cricketer and British Army officer

Personal information
- Full name: Godfrey Thomas Benedict Harvey
- Born: 26 April 1891; Romsey, Hampshire, England
- Died: 5 September 1957 (aged 66); Goudhurst, Kent, England
- Batting: Unknown
- Relatives: Frank Harvey (father)

Domestic team information
- Years: Team
- 1922/23: Europeans

Career statistics
Competition	First-class
Matches	2
Runs scored	30
Batting average	15.00
100s/50s	–/–
Top score	19
Catches/stumpings	1/–
- Source: ESPNcricinfo, 27 May 2022

Godfrey Thomas Benedict Harvey CIE (26 April 1891 — 5 September 1957) was an English cricketer and British Army officer.

The son of the Hampshire cricketer Frank Harvey, he was born at Romsey in April 1891. He was educated at Twyford School, before matriculating to Corpus Christi College, Cambridge. Harvey served in the British Indian Army Officer Reserve in the First World War, being commissioned in February 1917 as a lieutenant in the Cavalry Branch. While stationed in British India, Harvey made two appearances in first-class cricket in November 1922. The first came for a combined Europeans and Parsees team against a combined Hindus and Muslims team, while the second came for the Europeans cricket team against the Indians, with both matches played at Bombay. He scored 30 runs in these two matches. He was engaged as the Director of Publicity at Madras, where he held the rank of captain. Harvey was appointed a Companion to the Order of the Indian Empire in the 1946 New Year Honours, in recognition of his service. He died in England in September 1957 at Goudhurst, Kent.
