= Wilfred St Aubyn Malleson =

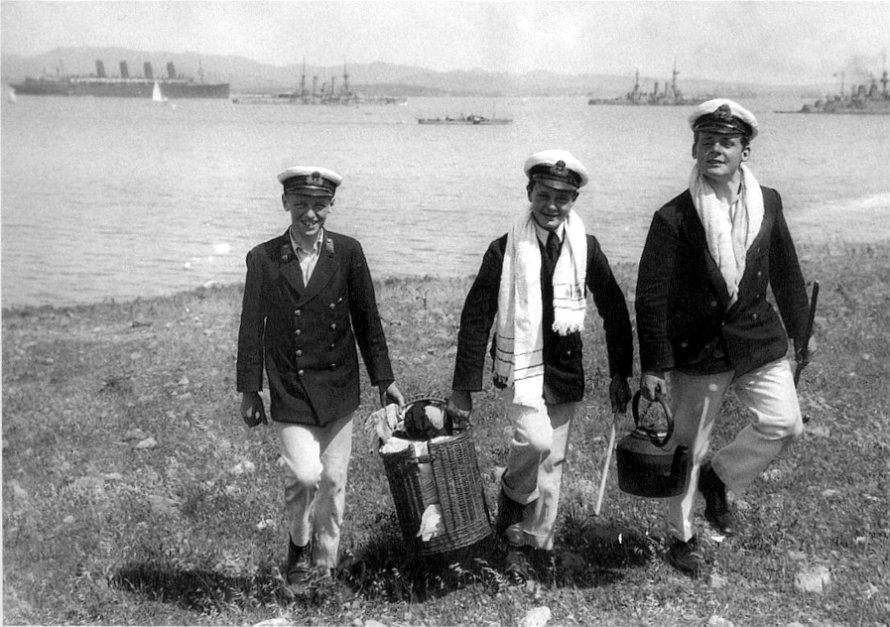
- Malleson (centre) with fellow midshipmen, George Drewry (right) and Greg Russell, on Imbros. Photo by Ernest Brooks.
- Born: 17 September 1896; Kirkee, British India
- Died: 21 July 1975 (aged 78); St Clement, Cornwall, England
- Burial place: Penmount Crematorium, Truro
- Military career
- Allegiance: United Kingdom
- Branch: Royal Navy
- Service years: 1914 - 1948
- Rank: Commander
- Units: SS River Clyde
- Conflicts: World War I World War II
- Awards: Victoria Cross

Commander Wilfred St. Aubyn Malleson VC (17 September 1896 – 21 July 1975) was a British recipient of the Victoria Cross, the highest and most prestigious award for gallantry in the face of the enemy that can be awarded to British and Commonwealth forces.

Malleson was born in Kirkee, India, the son of Major-General Sir Wilfrid Malleson KCIE CB and Ida Kathleen King, daughter of Frederick St Aubyn King. He attended the Royal Naval College Dartmouth from 1912 until 1914, being commissioned shortly before the start of World War I.

Malleson was an 18-year-old Midshipman in the Royal Navy during the First World War when the following deed took place for which he was awarded the VC.

On 25 April 1915 during the landing at V Beach, Cape Helles, Gallipoli, Turkey, Midshipman Malleson and three others (William Charles Williams, George Leslie Drewry, George McKenzie Samson) of HMS River Clyde assisted the commander (Edward Unwin) of the ship at the work of securing the lighters under very heavy rifle and Maxim fire. When the other midshipman with the party had failed, through sheer exhaustion to get a line from lighter to lighter, Midshipman Malleson swam with it himself and succeeded. The line subsequently broke and he afterwards made two further unsuccessful attempts at his self-imposed task.

He later achieved the rank of commander, and retired in 1948. He died at St Clement, Cornwall. His VC is on display at the Lord Ashcroft Gallery in the Imperial War Museum, London.

== Bibliography ==
- Snelling, Stephen (2012) [1995]. Gallipoli. VCs of the First World War. The History Press. ISBN 978-0752456539.
- Scotland's Forgotten Valour (Graham Ross, 1995)
- VCs of the First World War: The Naval VCs (Stephen Snelling, 2002)
