= HMS Hussar (1894) =

Gunboat of the Royal Navy

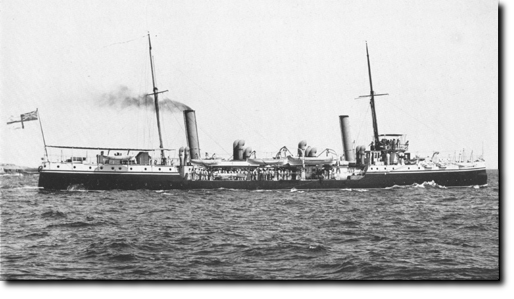
- Hussar

History

United Kingdom
- Name: HMS Hussar
- Builder: Devonport Dockyard
- Laid down: 3 April 1893
- Launched: 3 July 1894
- Commissioned: 3 December 1896
- Fate: Sold for scrap in December 1920; Resold on 13 July 1921

General characteristics
- Class & type: Dryad-class torpedo gunboat
- Displacement: 1,070 tons
- Length: 262 ft 6 in (80.0 m)
- Beam: 30 ft 6 in (9.3 m)
- Draught: 13 ft (4.0 m)
- Installed power: 3,500 ihp (2,600 kW)
- Propulsion: 2 × 3-cylinder vertical triple-expansion steam engines; Locomotive boilers; Twin screws
- Speed: 18.2 knots (33.7 km/h; 20.9 mph)
- Complement: 120
- Armament: 1 × QF 4.7-inch (12 cm) guns; 2 × 12-pounder guns; 1 × 6-pounder gun; 5 × 18-inch torpedo tubes; On conversion to a minesweeper in 1914 two torpedo tubes were removed

HMS Hussar was a Dryad-class torpedo gunboat of the Royal Navy. She was launched in 1894 and served in the Mediterranean between 1896 and 1905 before being used for fishery protection. During the Dardanelles campaign of 1915 her commanding officer and two of her ship's company won the Victoria Cross. She was broken up in 1921.

== Design ==
Ordered under the Naval Defence Act of 1889, which established the "Two-Power Standard", the class was contemporary with the first torpedo boat destroyers. With a length overall of 262 ft 6 in (80.01 m), a beam of 30 ft 6 in (9.30 m) and a displacement of 1,070 tons, these torpedo gunboats were not small ships by the standard of the time; they were larger than the majority of World War I destroyers. Hussar was engined by Hawthorn Leslie and Company with two sets of vertical triple-expansion steam engines, two locomotive-type boilers, and twin screws. This layout produced 3,500 indicated horsepower (2,600 kW), giving her a speed of 18.2 knots (33.7 km/h). She carried between 100 and 160 tons of coal and was crewed by 120 sailors and officers.

== Armament ==
When built Hussar acquired a different armament from the rest of the class; she was fitted with one (instead of two) QF 4.7-inch (12 cm) gun, one (instead of four) 6-pounder guns and two additional 12-pounder guns. Her primary weapon was five 18-inch (450 mm) torpedo tubes, (Note: British "18 inch" torpedoes were 17.72 inches (45.0 cm) in diameter) with two reloads. On conversion to a minesweeper in 1914 two of the five torpedo tubes were removed.

== History ==
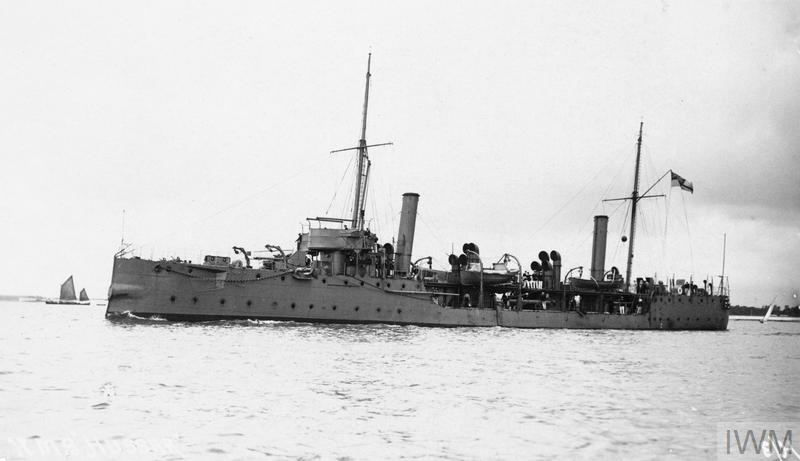
Torpedo gunboat HMS Hussar

Hussar served on the Mediterranean Station between 1896 and 1905. During part of her time there, she operated in the International Squadron, a multinational force made up of ships of the Austro-Hungarian Navy, French Navy, Imperial German Navy, Italian Royal Navy (Regia Marina), Imperial Russian Navy, and Royal Navy that intervened in the 1897-1898 Greek Christian uprising against the Ottoman Empire′s rule in Crete. On 6 November 1898, the last Ottoman forces on Crete, supervised by members of the crews of the British battleships HMS Revenge and HMS Empress of India, embarked on Hussar for transportation to Salonica, bringing 229 years of Ottoman occupation of Crete to an end.

Lieutenant Commander Marcus Rowley Hill was appointed in command of Hussar on 11 April 1899. In early February 1900 she left Malta homeward bound, and later that month arrived at Devonport, where she paid off on 12 March. She was re-commissioned by Lieutenant Adolphus Huddlestone Williamson the same day, and returned to the Mediterranean. In June 1902 she visited Alexandria, in October that year she was at Syracuse, Sicily, and late that year she was at Port Said and visited the Red Sea.

=== Yacht to the Commander-in-Chief, Mediterranean ===
In 1907 Hussar had her armament removed and was converted to become the yacht and despatch vessel for the Royal Navy's Commander-in-Chief, Mediterranean.

=== Fitted as a minesweeper ===
In 1914 Hussar was converted into a minesweeper, which was the fate of many such torpedo gunboats.

=== Dardanelles (1915) ===
In February 1915, Commander Edward Unwin took command of Hussar. For the landing at Cape Helles on 25 April 1915, Unwin took command of the steamer SS River Clyde. Unwin received the Victoria Cross for his actions during the landing, as did two of his crew from Hussar who were also on River Clyde, Able Seaman William Williams and Seaman George Samson.

== Disposal ==
Hussar was initially sold in December 1920, but was resold on 13 July 1921 to L Gatt, of Malta for breaking up.

== Bibliography ==
- Brown, Les (2023). Royal Navy Torpedo Vessels. Barnsley, UK: Seaforth Publishing. ISBN 978-1-3990-2285-9.
- Colledge, J. J.; Warlow, Ben (2006) [1969]. Ships of the Royal Navy: The Complete Record of All Fighting Ships of the Royal Navy from the 15th Century to the Present (3rd Rev ed.). London: Chatham Publishing. ISBN 978-1-86176-281-8. OCLC 67375475.
- McTiernan, Mick, A Very Bad Place Indeed For a Soldier. The British involvement in the early stages of the European Intervention in Crete. 1897 - 1898, King's College, London, September 2014.
- Lyon, David & Winfield, Rif (2004). The Sail and Steam Navy List: All the Ships of the Royal Navy 1815–1889. Chatham Publishing. ISBN 978-1-86176-032-6. OCLC 52620555.
