= Hardley, Hampshire =

Village in Hampshire, England

Coordinates: 50.840°N 1.391°W

Hardley
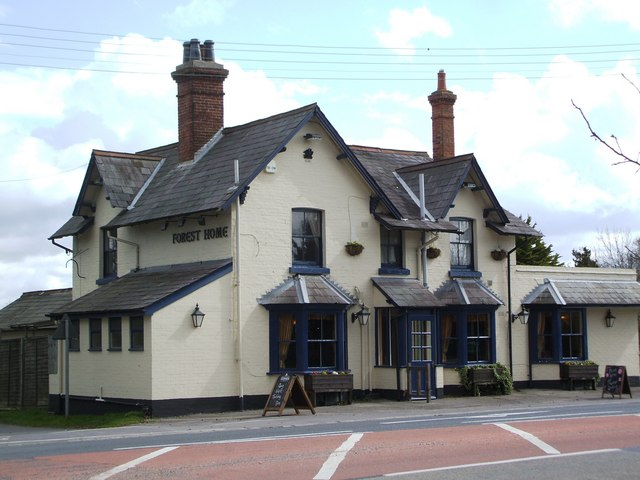
- Forest Home pub at Hardley

- Location within Hampshire
- OS grid reference: SU430047
- Civil parish: Fawley
- District: New Forest
- Shire county: Hampshire
- Region: South East
- Country: England
- Sovereign state: United Kingdom
- Post town: SOUTHAMPTON
- Postcode district: SO45
- Dialling code: 023
- Police: Hampshire and Isle of Wight
- Fire: Hampshire and Isle of Wight
- Ambulance: South Central
- UK Parliament: New Forest East

Hardley is a suburb of the village of Holbury in the civil parish of Fawley in Hampshire, England.

== History ==
The name Hardley means "hard clearing", presumably in relation to the soft marshlands which surround the area. Hardley is listed in the Domesday Book of 1086, when it was considered part of the New Forest. It is mentioned again in the 14th century, when William Chippe held lands there. In the 16th century the estate assumed the title of a manor in the hands of William Buckett, who held it from at least 1531 to 1579. After this it changed hands rapidly until finally conveyed to Richard Pittis, attorney of the King's Bench in 1628. There is no further trace of Hardley as a separate manor, but lands there were among the possessions of the Stanleys of the Paultons estate in 1693, 1745, and 1781.

A curious incident occurred in the 16th century when Thomas Tracie held the lease of Hardley Farm from William Buckett. Peter Kembridge and a man named Oglander wishing to rob Tracie of some of his possessions, arrested him, Oglander impersonating the sheriff's bailiff. Carried by force to an alehouse at Dibden, Tracie, who describes himself as "a poor plain simple creature," was compelled "to seal and deliver certain writings, but to what effect he himself knoweth not." Tracie's wife meanwhile followed her husband, and "made moan" for him outside the chamber. On gaining his freedom, Tracie appealed to the Court of Chancery.
