= Holbury =

Village in Hampshire, England

Coordinates: 50.8328°N 1.3881°W

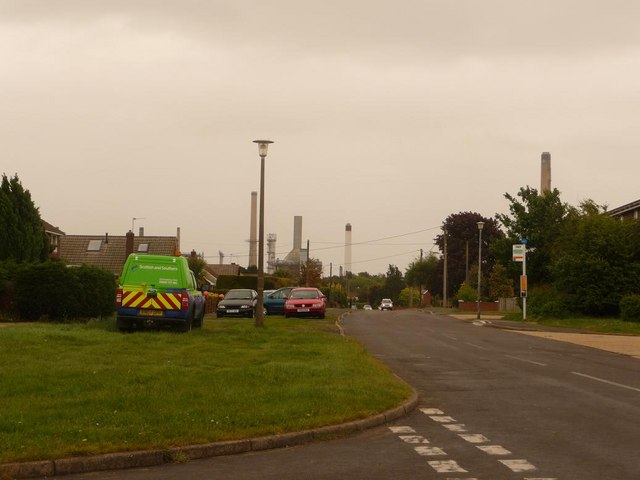
- Holbury, looking towards Fawley refinery

- Location within Hampshire
- Population: 6,000
- OS grid reference: SU435035
- Civil parish: Fawley
- District: New Forest
- Shire county: Hampshire
- Region: South East
- Country: England
- Sovereign state: United Kingdom
- Post town: SOUTHAMPTON
- Postcode district: SO45
- Dialling code: 023
- Police: Hampshire and Isle of Wight
- Fire: Hampshire and Isle of Wight
- Ambulance: South Central
- UK Parliament: New Forest East

Holbury is a village in Hampshire, England. It is part of the parish of Fawley.

== Overview ==
Historically a small and scarcely populated village, Holbury and the adjoining hamlet of Hardley now has a sizeable population of approximately 6000, and a considerable number of shops and businesses. This growth has been principally due to the influence of the Esso oil refinery at Fawley and the area's proximity to the city of Southampton.

It is served by a number of schools, including Manor Infant School for children aged 4 to 8, Cadland Primary School (formerly Holbury Infant School and Holbury Junior School) for children aged 4 to 11, and New Forest Academy for students aged 11 to 16. The school also has an incorporated sixth form college for students aged 16 to 18. Many pupils of New Forest Academy also go on to Brockenhurst College, Totton College or Southampton City College.

== History ==
The name Holbury apparently means "hollow fortification", although it is not clear what feature in the landscape this name refers to. The first trace of Holbury Manor is in 1312, when Roger Bernerall and Gilbert de Shupton obtained licence of the king to "grant land in Holebury to the abbey of King's Beaulieu." Holbury remained in the hands of the abbots of Beaulieu until the dissolution of that monastery in 1538. Four years later Henry VIII granted it to Robert Whyte in exchange for a manor and lands in Middlesex. Some time before 1560 the manor fell into the hands of Thomas Pace. After the death of Thomas Pace, Holbury Manor was combined with the estates of Cadlands (now beneath Fawley Refinery) and Langley. In 1641 Peter Cardonell, a Norman merchant from Caen, leased the estates from Nicholas Pescod, and Holbury is mentioned as a whole manor when Nicholas Pescod granted a lease of the site to Adam de Cardonell, probably the son of Peter. Henceforth the combined estates were divided, and that part which corresponds to Holbury Farm passed into the Stanley family in 1693.

Holbury manor house is a 17th/18th century recasing in red brick of an earlier building, originally a Tudor mansion. Next to it is a moated site, perhaps the site of the monastic manor and associated buildings. The earthwork contains sites of three buildings within the moated area and others outside.
