= SS River Clyde =

1905 British cargo vessel

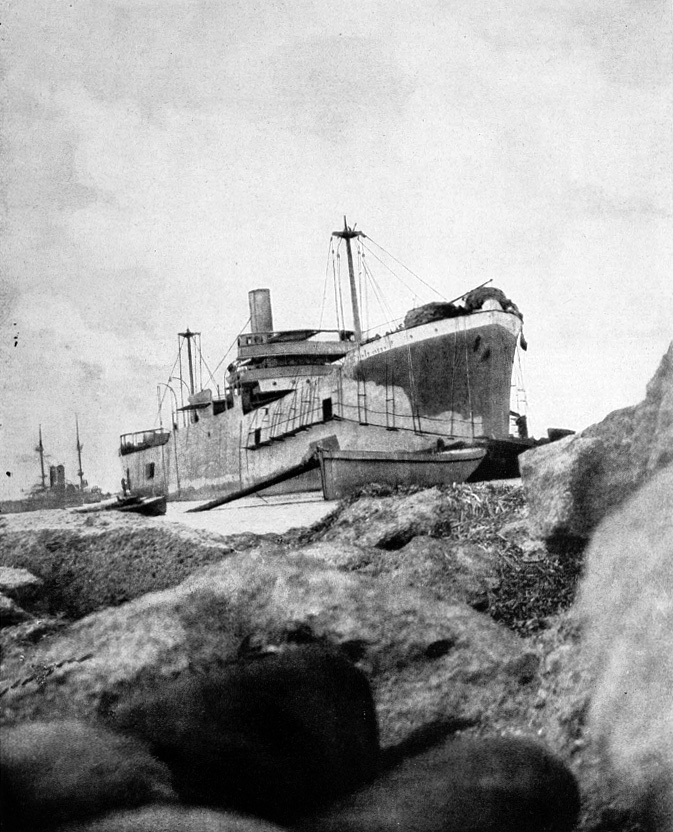
- River Clyde at V Beach on the Gallipoli peninsula, showing disembarkation ports cut in her starboard side.

History

United Kingdom
- Name: River Clyde
- Namesake: River Clyde, Scotland
- Owner: Steamship 'River Clyde' Co Ltd (Ormond, Cook & Co), Glasgow (1905–1915); Sefton Steam Ship Co Ltd (H E Moss & Co), Liverpool (1915)
- Port of registry: Glasgow
- Builder: Russell & Co, Port Glasgow
- Yard number: 537
- Launched: 23 February 1905
- Completed: March 1905
- Out of service: 1915
- Identification: Official number 121217 Signal code HCDW
- Fate: Sold to The Admiralty

United Kingdom
- Name: River Clyde
- Acquired: 1915
- Out of service: 1920

Spain
- Name: Angela
- Owner: A Pardo
- Port of registry: Santander
- Acquired: 1920
- Out of service: 1928

Spain
- Name: Angela (until 1931); Maruja y Aurora (1931 onwards)
- Owner: Gumersindo Junquera Blanco
- Port of registry: Gijón
- Acquired: 7 December 1928
- Out of service: 27 August 1937
- Identification: signal code HCPJ (as Maruja y Aurora)
- Fate: Seized by Spanish Nationalists, assigned to Spanish National Navy

Nationalist Spain
- Name: Maruja y Aurora
- Acquired: 27 August 1937
- Out of service: 1939
- Fate: Returned to former owners

Spain
- Name: Maruja y Aurora
- Owner: Gumersindo Junquera Blanco (1939–1948); Gumersindo Junquera S.A. (1948–1966)
- Port of registry: Gijón
- Acquired: 1939
- Out of service: 1965
- Identification: IMO number: 5227241 signal code HCPJ
- Fate: Scrapped in 1966

General characteristics
- Type: collier
- Tonnage: 3,913 GRT; tonnage under deck 3,658; 2,526 NRT
- Length: 344.8 ft (105.1 m)
- Beam: 49.8 ft (15.2 m)
- Draught: 17.9 ft (5.5 m)
- Installed power: 374 NHP
- Propulsion: Kincaid & Co. 3-cylinder triple expansion steam engine; single screw

SS River Clyde was a 3,913 GRT British collier built by Russell & Co of Port Glasgow on the Firth of Clyde and completed in March 1905. In the First World War the Admiralty requisitioned her for the Royal Navy and in 1915 she took part in the Gallipoli landings. After the war she was repaired and sold to Spanish owners, with whom she spent a long civilian career trading in the Mediterranean before being scrapped in 1966.

== Propulsion ==
River Clyde had nine corrugated furnaces with a combined grate area of 169 sq ft (15.7 m^{2}) that heated three 180 lb_{f}/in^{2} single-ended boilers with a combined heating surface of 6,150 sq ft (571 m^{2}) to raise steam for her three-cylinder triple expansion engine. The engine was built by J. G. Kincaid & Co. of Greenock and was rated at 374 NHP.

== Pre-war service ==
In February 1909, the River Clyde was towed into Moreton Bay by the Falls of Orchy. The River Clyde had been carrying coal from Newcastle, N.S.W. to Manila. She was on her way back to Newcastle, when she ran out of bunker coal after encountering adverse weather. She had been adrift for 25 hours, after first having used wood from her hold ceiling and bulkheads to fuel her boilers to divert to Moreton Bay and recoal.

== First World War ==
=== A Trojan Horse ===
During the planning of landings at Gallipoli, Commander Edward Unwin, formerly of the Dryad-class torpedo gunboat HMS Hussar proposed the use of an anonymous-looking collier as a Trojan Horse, carrying about 2,000 troops, to be run onto V Beach just after the first wave of about 2,000 troops had landed, doubling the number of troops in the first wave. On 12 April 1915 River Clyde was purchased by the Admiralty to be adapted to a landing ship for the joint French and British invasion of the Gallipoli Peninsula. She retained her name. Openings were cut in her steel hull as sally ports from which troops would emerge onto broad gangways and then to a steam hopper (a flat-bottomed, shallow-draft boat used to collect spoil from a dredger).

A bridge of three lighters with special covered decks to make a pontoon bridge from the ship to the beach in case the gap between the ship and the lighter was too great, a survey of the beach being impractical. Number 3 Armoured Car Squadron Royal Naval Air Service (Lieutenant-Commander Josiah Wedgwood) was ordered to use 11 of his Maxim guns on the ship. Boiler plate and sandbags were mounted on the fo'c'sle, the upper deck and bridge for the guns. Work began on painting River Clyde's hull sandy yellow as camouflage, but this was incomplete by the time of the landing.

=== Mudros harbour ===
By 11 April 1915 River Clyde was in the natural harbour of Mudros on the Aegean island of Lemnos, where French and British ships were assembling for the landings. The troops on River Clyde took the opportunity to practise quick disembarkation in full marching order; they were issued with a pamphlet containing excerpts from textbooks on landings and combined operations with the Navy. The troop ship HMT Aragon reached Mudros from Alexandria in Egypt and transferred the 1st Battalion, Royal Munster Fusiliers and a company of the 1st Royal Dublin Fusiliers (86th Brigade), two companies of the 2nd Battalion, the Hampshire Regiment, a platoon of the Anson Battalion, the GHQ Signals Section, the Worcestershire Regiment Field Company RE and other detachments of the 88th Brigade, 29th Division to River Clyde.

== Landing at Cape Helles ==
=== V Beach ===
On 25 April 1915 River Clyde sailed to take part in the landing at Cape Helles. She was carrying 2,000 soldiers; mostly from 86th Brigade, units of the 29th Division, the 1st Battalion of the Royal Munster Fusiliers and men from the 2nd Battalion, the Hampshire Regiment, the 1st Battalion, the Royal Dublin Fusiliers. Unwin beached River Clyde at V Beach beneath the Sedd el Bahr castle, on the tip of the Gallipoli peninsula. The plan failed and the River Clyde, beached under the guns of the Ottoman defenders, became a death trap. Three attempts to land made by companies of Munsters, Royal Dublins and Hampshires were costly failures. Further landing attempts were abandoned and the surviving soldiers waited until nightfall before trying again. Members of River Clyde's crew maintained the footways from the ship to the beach and recovered the wounded.

=== Subsequent events ===
After the Helles beach-head was established, V Beach became the base for the French contingent and River Clyde remained beached as a quay and breakwater. Her condensers provided fresh water and her holds became a field dressing station. She remained a constant target for Turkish gunners ashore.

== Victoria Cross ==
Six Victoria Crosses were awarded at V Beach to sailors or men from the Royal Naval Division who had attempted to maintain the bridge of lighters and recover the wounded, including Commander Unwin, Sub-Lieutenant Arthur Tisdall, Able Seaman William Williams, Seaman George Samson and Midshipmen George Drewry and Wilfred Malleson. Lieutenant Colonel Charles Doughty-Wylie was awarded a posthumous VC, for leading the attack finally to capture Sedd el Bahr on the morning 26 April, during which William Cosgrove of the 1st Royal Munster Fusiliers was also awarded a VC.

== Civilian service ==
In 1919, River Clyde was refloated by the Ocean Salvage Co. and taken to Malta. The British Government refused a proposal to purchase her to return to the UK for mooring in the River Thames as a monument to the landings because of the cost. She was repaired at Malta and sold in February 1920 to civilian Spanish owners. She operated as a tramp steamer in the Mediterranean, first as Angela and then Maruja y Aurora. Maruja and Aurora were the names of the eldest child of each of the two partners in the company, Gumersindo Junquera Blanco and Vicente Figaredo Herrero. She was seized by Spanish Nationalist forces at Santander in August 1937 and used by the Nationalist navy, during which time she captured the steamship Margarita. She made trips between Santander and Ferrol and carried troops between Gijón and Bilbao. Returned to her former owners 18 months later, she resumed her commercial role; she rescued three British airmen during the Second World War. In 1965 there was an attempt to buy and preserve River Clyde but the British Government were unwilling to purchase her. In 1966 she was sold to Desguaces y Salvamentos S.A. for £42,000; scrapping at Avilés, Spain, commenced on 15 March 1966.

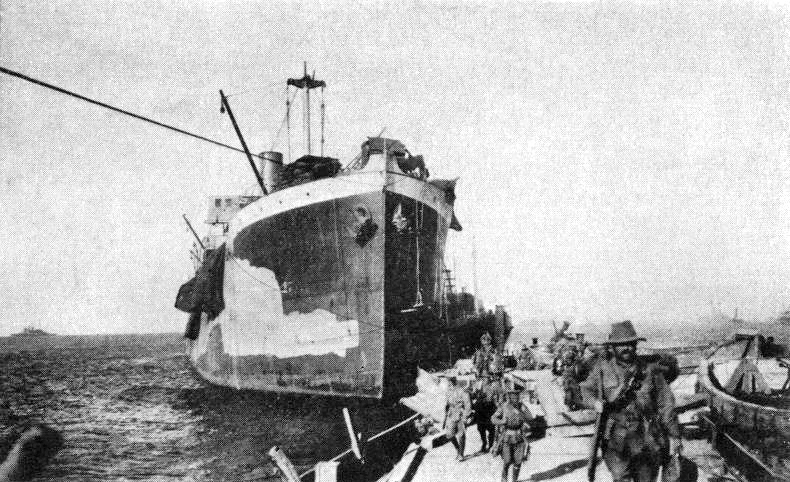
Soldiers of the Australian 2nd Infantry Brigade disembarking at V Beach on 6 May 1915, for the Second Battle of Krithia. River Clyde is beached and serving as a quay. The light coloured patch on her starboard bow is part of her unfinished yellow camouflage.

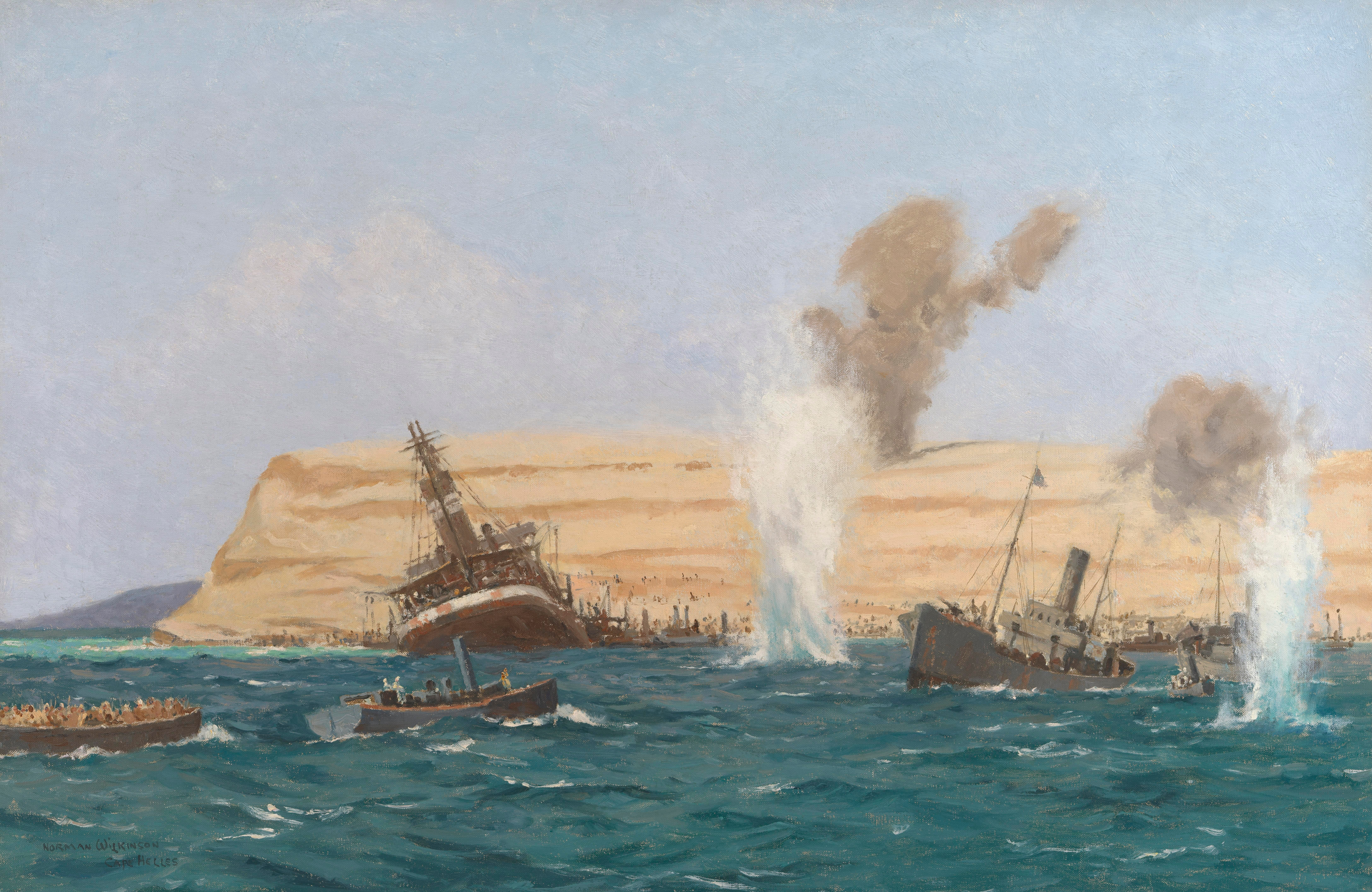
The Base Camp, Cape Helles, Under Shell Fire. The SS River Clyde is seen aground. By Norman Wilkinson, August 1915.
