= Asclettin =

Asclettin (from Old Norse Ásketill) is a masculine Norman given name. It may refer to:

- Asclettin, Count of Acerenza (fl. 1016–42), Norman mercenary
- Asclettin, Count of Aversa (r. died 1045), son of preceding
- Asclettin (Sicilian chancellor), officer serving William I of Sicily
