= Edward Unwin =

Captain Edward Unwin VC CB CMG
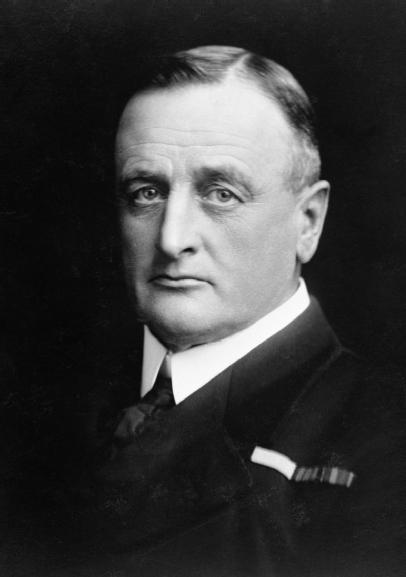
- Born: 20 April 1864; Fawley, Hampshire
- Died: 19 April 1950 (aged 85); Hindhead, Surrey
- Burial place: St Luke's Churchyard, Grayshott
- Military career
- Allegiance: United Kingdom
- Branch: Royal Navy
- Service years: 1895–1909; 1914–1920
- Rank: Captain
- Commands: HMS Hussar; HMS Amethyst
- Conflicts: Benin Expedition of 1897; Second Boer War; First World War
- Awards: Victoria Cross; Companion of the Order of the Bath; Companion of the Order of St Michael and St George; Order of the Nile, 3rd Class (Egypt); Officer of the Legion of Honour (France)

Captain Edward Unwin, VC, CB, CMG (20 April 1864 – 19 April 1950) was a Royal Navy officer and an English recipient of the Victoria Cross, the highest award for gallantry in the face of the enemy that can be awarded to British and Commonwealth forces.

== Early life ==
Born in Fawley, Hampshire on 20 April 1864, Unwin joined the merchant navy at the age of 16 and spent 15 years serving on clippers with P&O. He trained at HMS Conway and joined the Royal Navy on 16 October 1895 (part of the "Hungry Hundred", merchant mariners recruited to the Navy to fill a shortage of junior officers) and served in the Benin Expedition and the Second Boer War. In November 1901 he was appointed to HMS Vivid to serve in HMS Forth, but only five months later he was transferred in April 1902 to HMS Monarch, serving in the South Pacific. He was lent to HMS Hawke for service on that ship during the voyage to South Africa where the Monarch was stationed. Returning to the United Kingdom later the same year, he was early 1903 sent on a pilotage and compass course at RN College.

Unwin retired in 1909 with the rank of commander. He was recalled to the service on 29 July 1914, shortly before the outbreak of the First World War.

== First World War ==
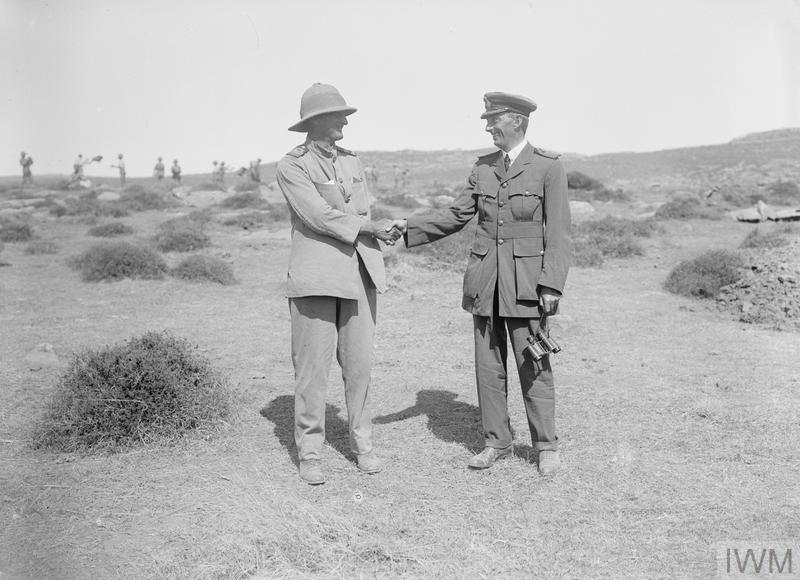
Commodore Edward Unwin VC (left) receiving congratulations on being gazetted on 16th August, in connection with the SS RIVER CLYDE at 'V' Beach. He was beach master at Suvla Bay when this photograph was taken.

Initially Unwin served aboard HMS Iron Duke on the staff of Admiral Sir John Jellicoe but in February 1915 he took command of the torpedo gunboat HMS Hussar which had operated as a despatch vessel for the Commander in Chief, Mediterranean and was now a minesweeper.

In 1915, when planning began for the amphibious landing on the Gallipoli peninsula, Unwin proposed beaching the 4,000 ton collier SS River Clyde on the narrow beach beneath Sedd el Bahr at Cape Helles, known as V Beach, thereby allowing 2,000 troops to be landed together. At the age of 51, Unwin was promoted to acting Captain and given command of the River Clyde for the operation.

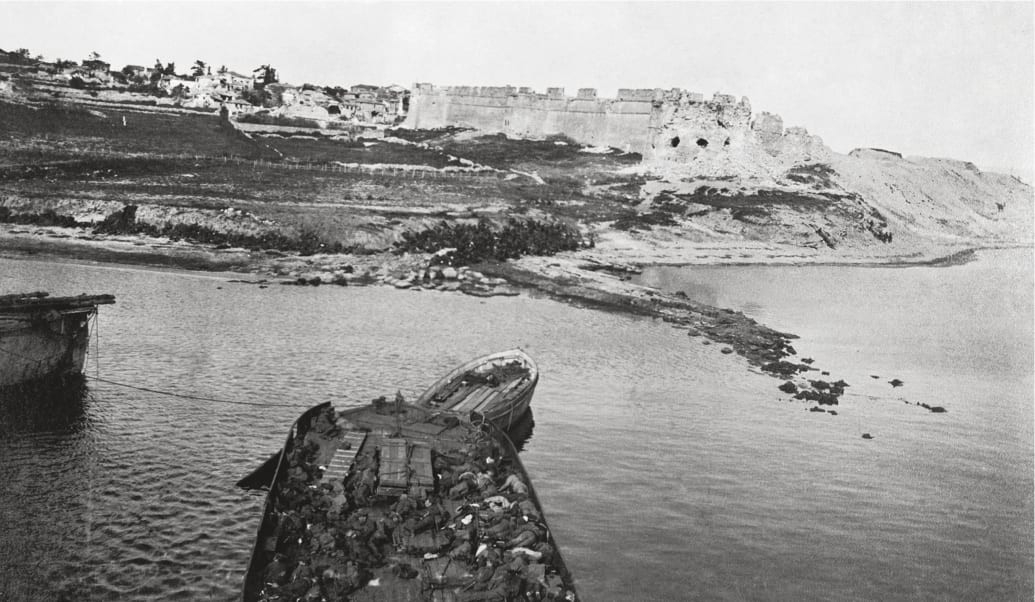
The view from the River Clyde of the lighters and Sedd el Bahr castle, 25 April 1915.

The River Clyde beached at 06:22 on 25 April 1915, and the plan called for a steam hopper to form a bridge from the ship to the shore. However, the Dardanelles current swept the hopper away so Unwin, accompanied by Able Seaman William Charles Williams, who had served under him on the Hussar and had been ordered to stay by his side, dived overboard and manhandled two lighters into position, lashing them together to form the bridge. All the while Unwin was under fire from the Turkish defenders. When Williams was mortally wounded, Unwin went to his aid and the lighter he was holding was swept away.

Unwin collapsed from cold and exhaustion, his place being taken by other men. After an hour of rest, he returned to the lighters until he was wounded and collapsed again. Once the attempts to land had ceased, Unwin went out a third time to attempt to recover wounded from the beach; according to one account he retrieved seven men. For his actions, he was awarded the Victoria Cross. The citation read:

While in SS River Clyde, observing that the lighters which were to form the bridge to the shore had broken adrift, Commander Unwin left the ship, and under a murderous fire attempted to get the lighters into position. He worked on, until suffering from the effects of cold and immersion, he was obliged to return to the ship, where he was wrapped up in blankets. Having in some degree recovered, he returned to his work against the doctor's order and completed it. He was later attended by the doctor for three abrasions caused by bullets, after which he once more left the ship, this time in a lifeboat, to save some wounded men who were lying in shallow water near the beach. He continued at this heroic labour under continuous fire, until forced to stop through physical exhaustion.

— the London Gazette, 16 August 1915

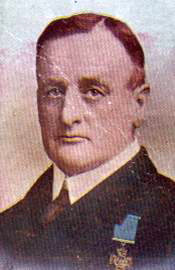
cigarette card image

In August, when a new landing was to be made by the British IX Corps at Suvla as part of the Battle of Sari Bair, Unwin was given command of the landing boats, known as Beetles. He was the first to report on the landing to the corps commander, Lieutenant General Sir Frederick Stopford, and advised against landing further troops inside Suvla Bay due to the darkness and reefs.

Unwin was back at Suvla as Naval Transport Officer for the evacuation in December – he was aboard the last boat to leave the beach. When a soldier fell overboard, Unwin dived in to rescue him. Observing this act, Lieutenant General Sir Julian Byng, the new IX Corps commander, remarked to Commodore Roger Keyes:

You really must do something about Unwin. You should send him home; we want several little Unwins.

In 1916 Unwin took command of HMS Amethyst and in 1917 became Naval Transport Officer, Egypt. He later achieved the rank of commodore.

== Later life ==
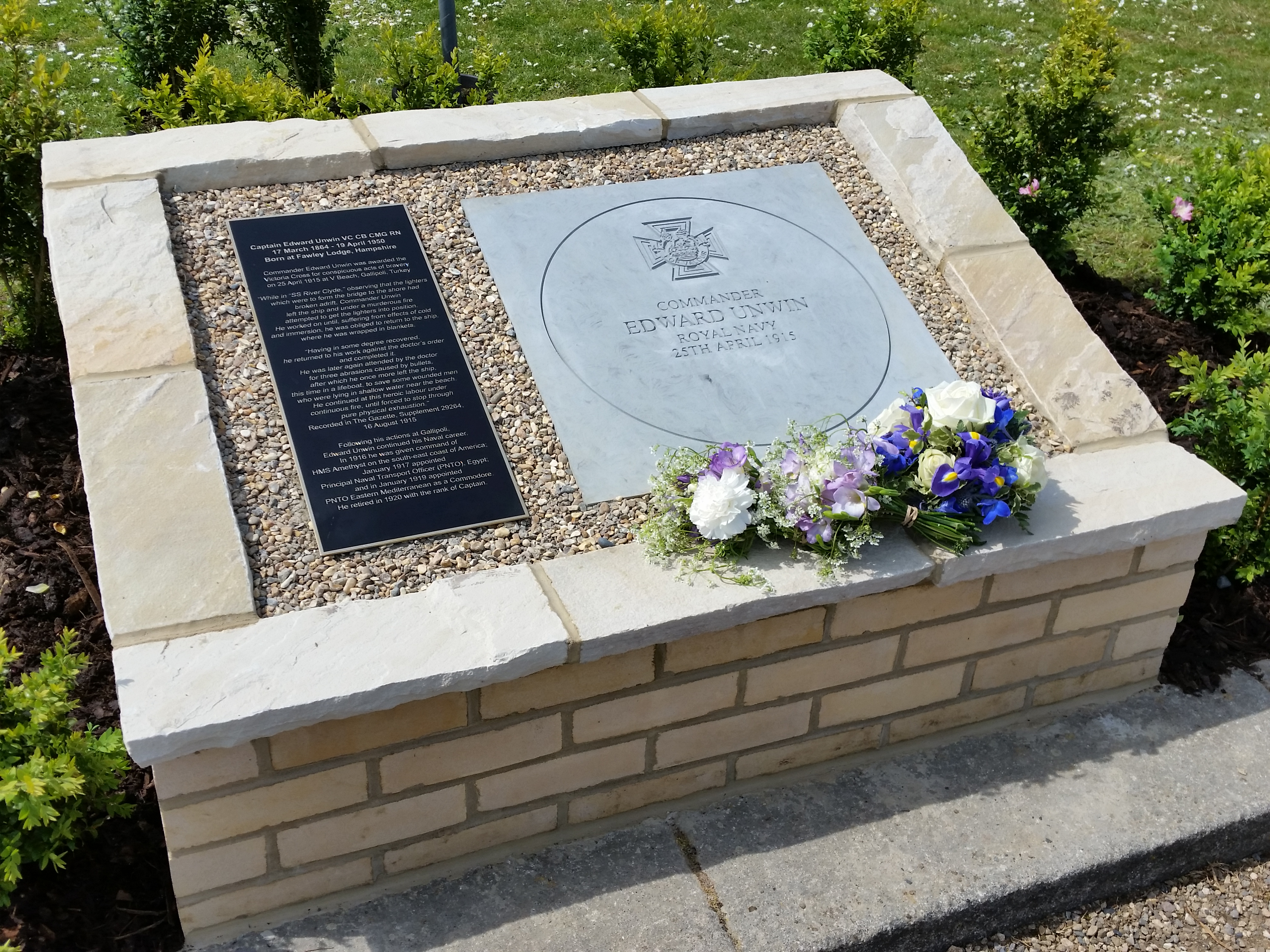
Memorial unveiled 11 May 2015 as part of the 100 years remembrance for VC winners.

Between 1937-1939, Unwin was a member of the national council of The Link, a pro-Nazi organisation. Unwin played little active part in the affairs of The Link, and instead provided prestige to the group, which presented itself as an organisation that all patriotic British people should rally to. Unwin died on 19 April 1950 and is buried in Grayshott, Surrey. His Victoria Cross has been loaned by his family to the Imperial War Museum, London, where it is on display.

A memorial to Edward Unwin was unveiled in Hythe, Hampshire (close to his birthplace) on 11 May 2015 with details of the action in which he was awarded his VC.

== Bibliography ==
- Griffiths, Richard (1980). Fellow Travellers of the Right British Enthusiasts for Nazi Germany, 1933-9. London: Constable. ISBN 0571271324.
- Snelling, Stephen (2012) [1995]. Gallipoli. VCs of the First World War. The History Press. ISBN 978-0752456539.
