= Langley, Hampshire =

Village in Hampshire, England

Coordinates: 50.808°N 1.369°W

Langley
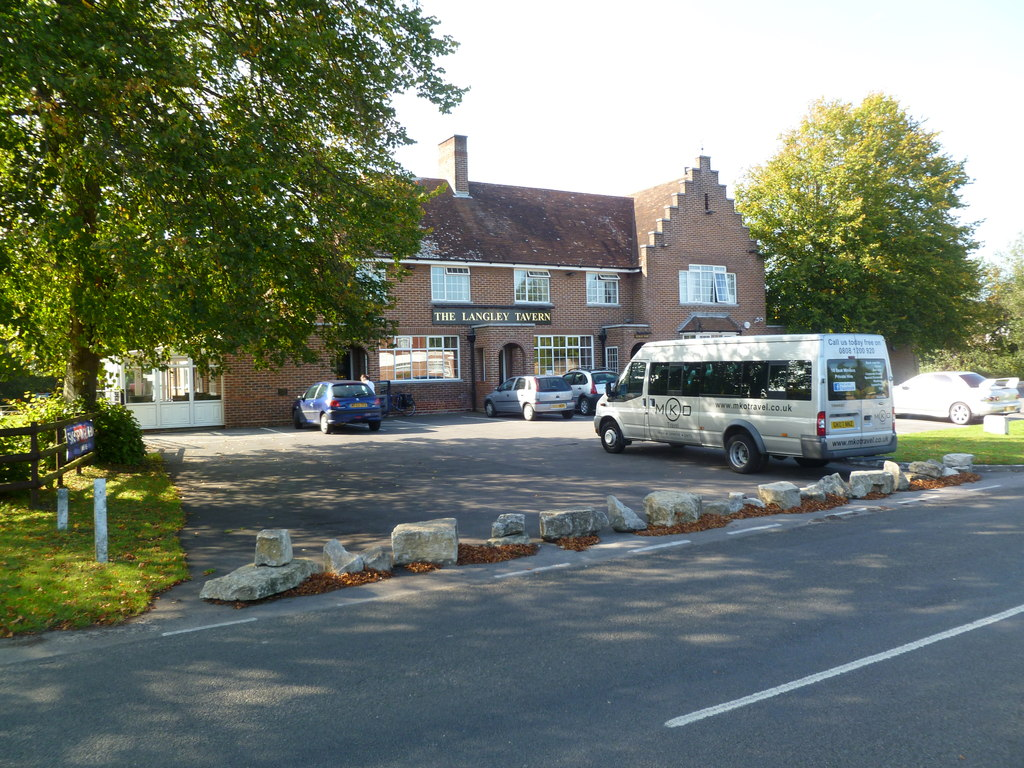
- Langley Tavern

- Location within Hampshire
- OS grid reference: SU445011
- Civil parish: Fawley
- District: New Forest
- Shire county: Hampshire
- Region: South East
- Country: England
- Sovereign state: United Kingdom
- Post town: Southampton
- Postcode district: SO45
- Dialling code: 023
- Police: Hampshire and Isle of Wight
- Fire: Hampshire and Isle of Wight
- Ambulance: South Central
- UK Parliament: New Forest East

Langley is a small village in the civil parish of Fawley in Hampshire, England.

== History ==
The name Langley means "long wood/clearing". Langley is listed in the Domesday Book of 1086, when it was held by Hugh of St Quentin. In 1372 John Baron of South Langley and Julia his wife held a messuage and land in South Langley. Thence the tenement passed indirectly to Richard Goolde and his wife Joan in 1413. John Ludlowe held the land in 1482. In 1500 the right of the Ludlowes to hold the manor (here so-called for the first time) was fiercely disputed in the Court of Chancery by one William Fletcher. The Ludlowes evidently won, for in 1609 Sir Edward Ludlowe sold the manor of Langley to Sir Walter Longe. This united the manor of Langley to the manors of Cadlands (now beneath Fawley Refinery) and Holbury, all three following the same descent henceforward. One part of the merged estate eventually became Langley Farm held by the Stanley family at the beginning of the 20th century.

The modern village now lies on the site of the old manor house. At the beginning of the 20th century Langley and Fawley were the only two villages in the parish. With the growth of the village of Blackfield the ward is now referred to as the Fawley, Blackfield, and Langley Ward.
