= Sedd el Bahr =

Seddülbahir Sedd el Bahr
- Village
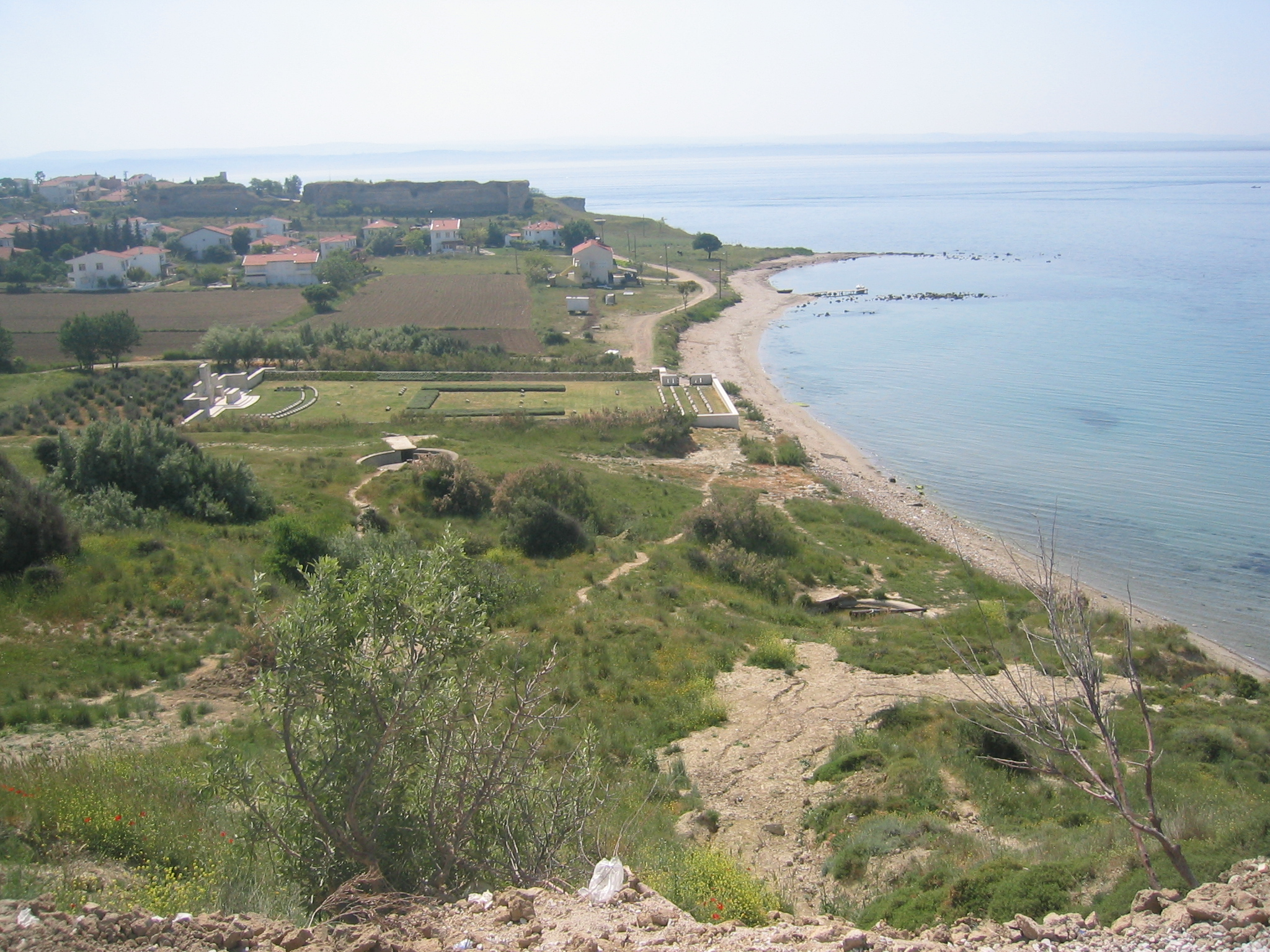
- V Beach at Gallipoli

- Location within Turkey Location within Marmara
- Coordinates: 40.0447°N 26.1877°E
- Country: Turkey
- Province: Çanakkale
- District: Eceabat
- Population (2021): 277
- Time zone: UTC+3 (TRT)
- Postal code: 17500
- Area code: 0286

Sedd el Bahr (Turkish: Seddülbahir, Ottoman Turkish: سدالبحر, meaning "Walls of the Sea") is a village in the Eceabat District, Çanakkale Province, Turkey. It is located at Cape Helles on the Gallipoli peninsula in Turkey. The village lies east of the cape, on the shore of the Dardanelles. It was the site of V Beach, the landing zone for two Irish battalions, including one from the SS River Clyde, on 25 April 1915 during the Gallipoli Campaign in World War I. Its population is 277 (2021).

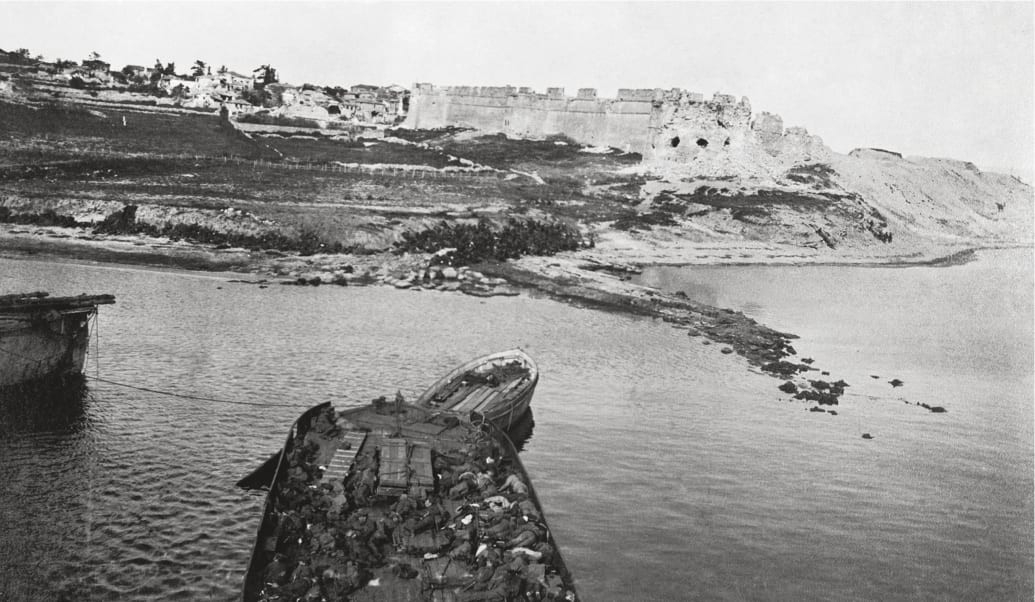
Sedd el Bahr castle and village seen from the SS River Clyde during the landing at Cape Helles, 25 April 1915.

At the tip of the Sedd el Bahr promontory is the castle (Sedd el Bahr Kale), also known as Old Castle (Eski Kale), which was built in 1659. The British designated the castle "Fort No. 3" (at the other end of V Beach was "Fort No. 1", also known as Fort Ertuğrul) and it was equipped with ten artillery pieces, including two 28 cm Krupp L/22 guns. The castle was bombarded by the Royal Navy on 3 November 1914, causing serious damage and killing 86 Ottoman soldiers.

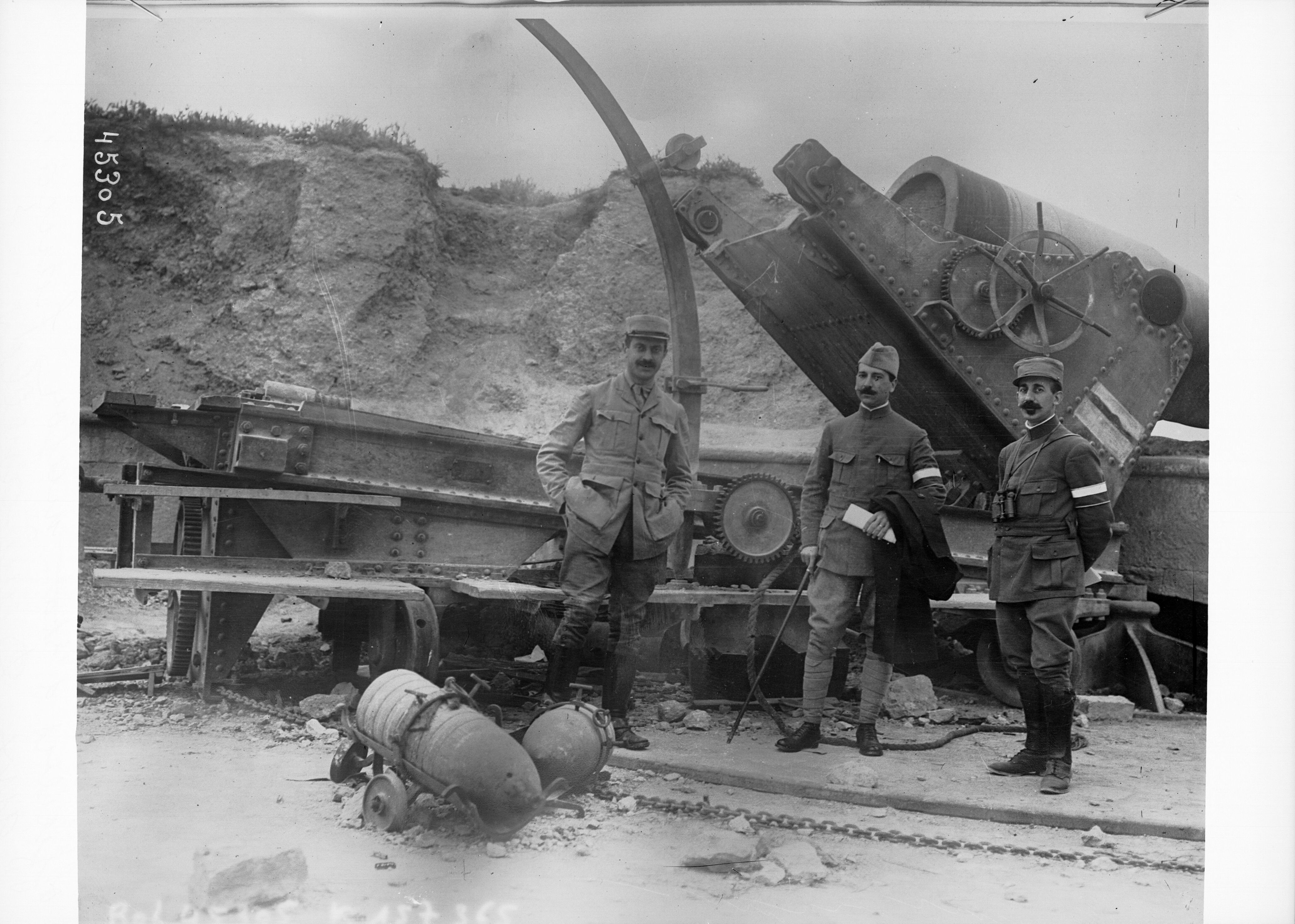
A captured Krupp 28 m L/22 at Sedd el Bahre

The British attacked the Ottoman forts on 19 February 1915 at the start of the naval operations in the Dardanelles Campaign. Sedd el Bahr was subjected to repeated bombardment and raids by naval demolition teams and the position was deemed too exposed. By the peak of naval operations on 18 March, Sedd el Bahr and Kum Kale, across the straits, had been eliminated as threats.

Sedd el Bahr is mentioned in the traditional Irish song "The Foggy Dew" in the line "It was better to die 'neath an Irish sky than at Suvla or Sud el bar". This line references the 1916 Easter Rising, which took place in Ireland around a year after the landing at Suvla Bay as part of the Gallipoli Campaign.

== Gallery ==
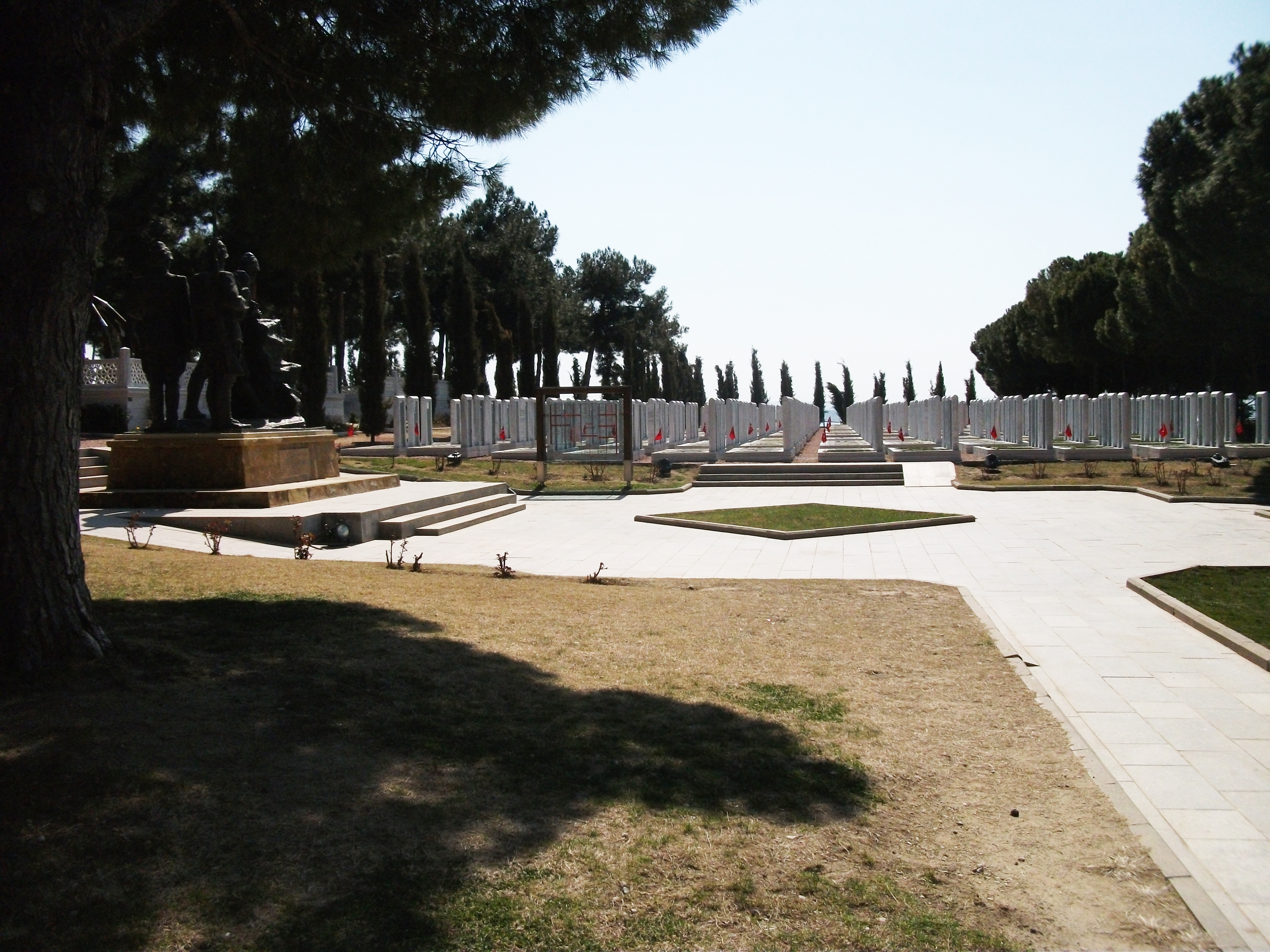

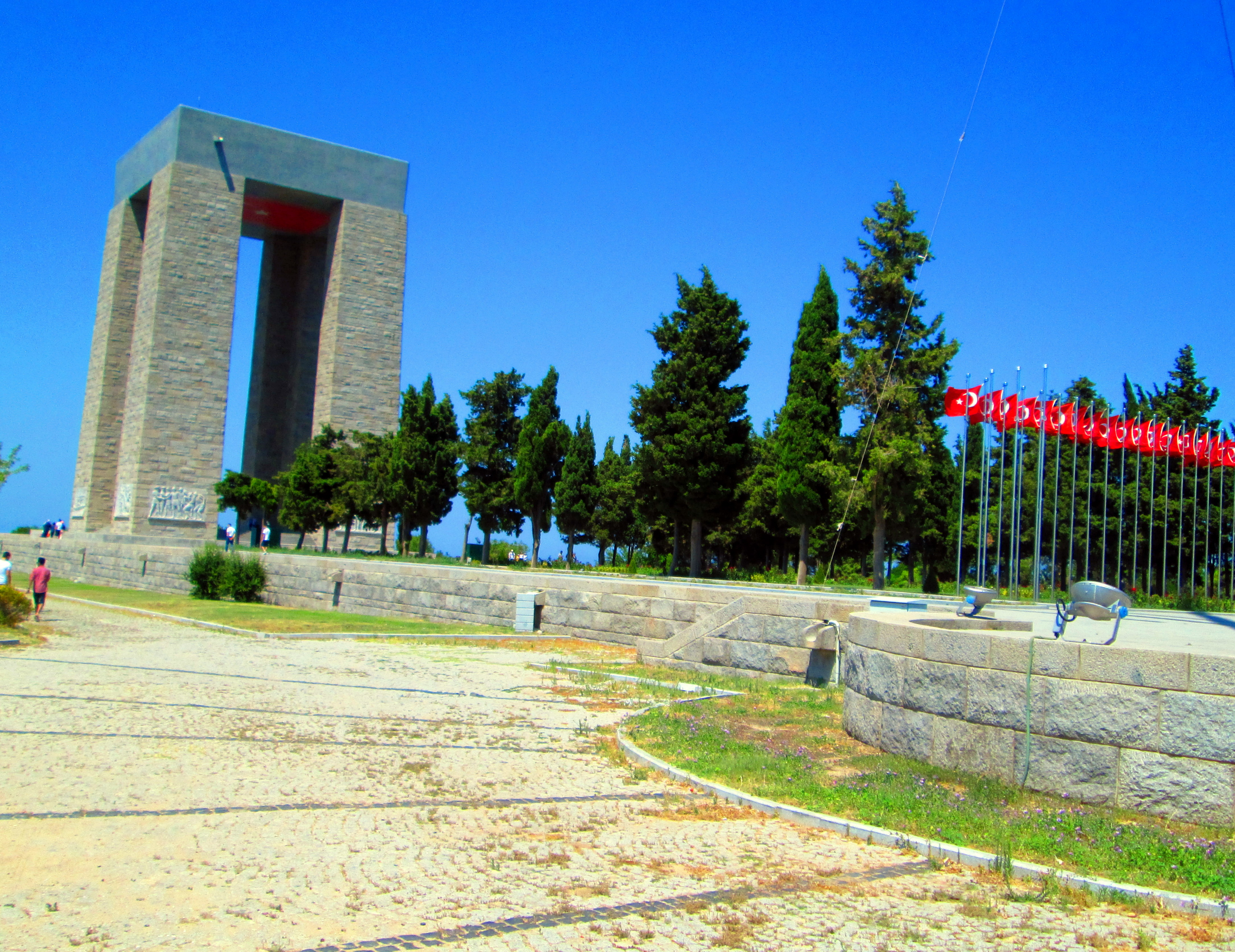

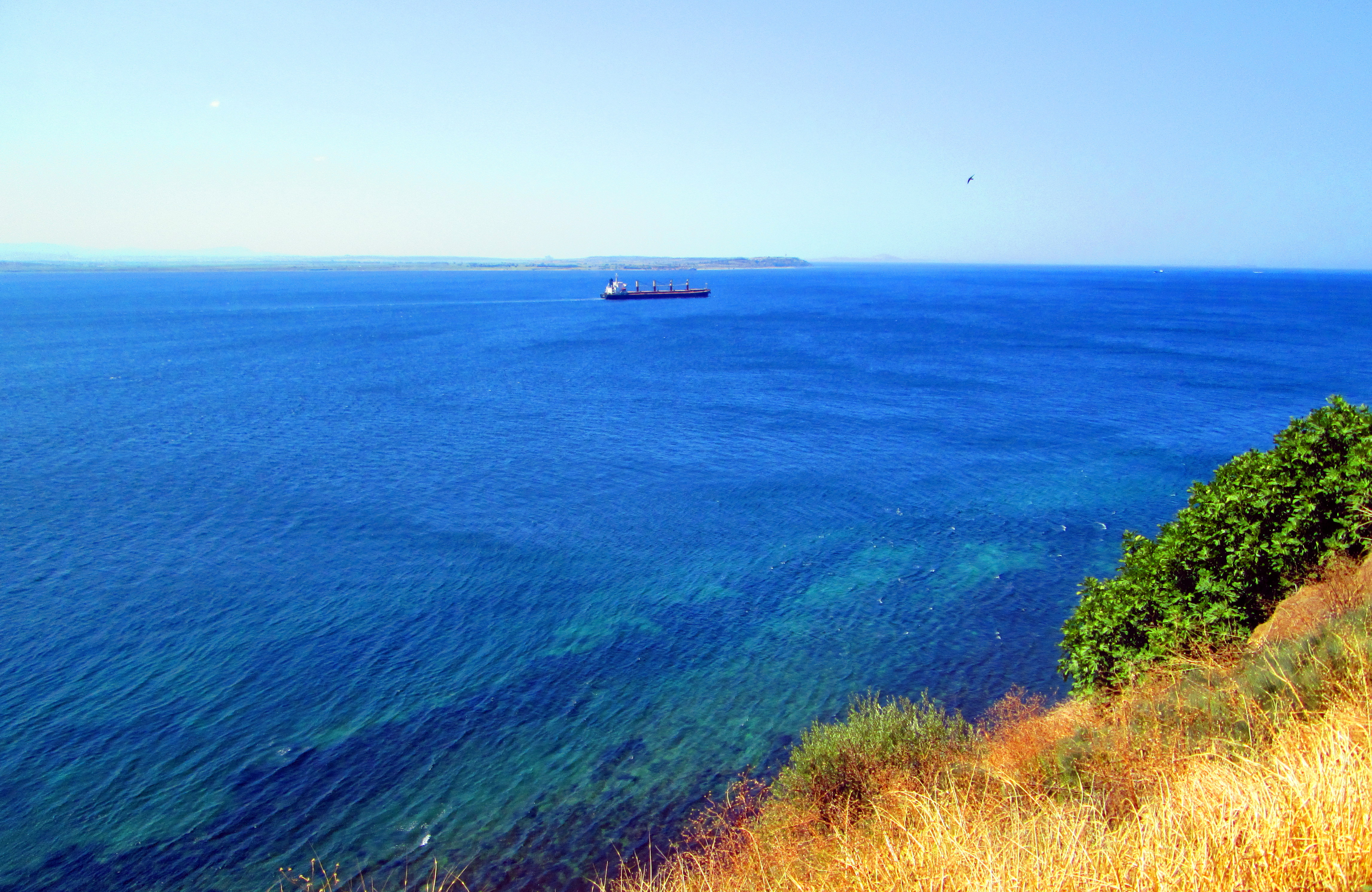

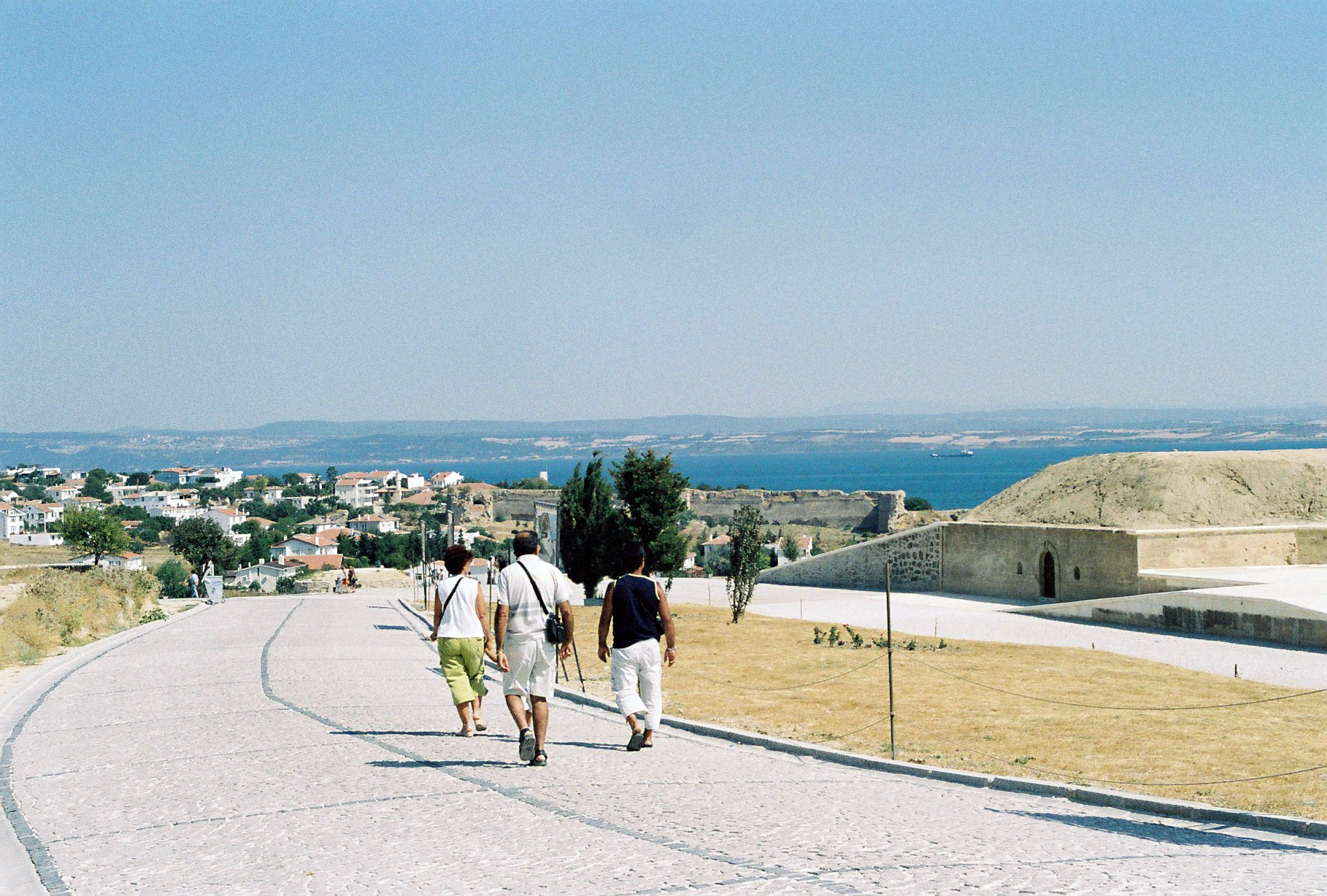

== See also ==
- Landing at Cape Helles
