= Asclettin (Sicilian chancellor) =

Asclettin or Aschettin (Latin: Asclettinus, Asclittinus, Aschetinus, Italianised as Asclettino, Asclittino, or Ascontino), Archdeacon of Catania (1145 – 1156) and chancellor of Sicily (March or April 1155 – before April 1156), was an Italo-Norman officer serving William I of Sicily.

In 1156, he was imprisoned in Palermo for treason.

== Sources ==
- The history of the tyrants of Sicily by "Hugo Falcandus," 1154-69. By Ugo Falcando, G. A. Loud, Thomas E. J. Wiedemann. Manchester University Press, 1998. ISBN 0-7190-5435-4
- The administration of the Norman kingdom of Sicily. By Hiroshi Takayama. Brill, 1993. ISBN 90-04-09865-8
- Norwich, John Julius. The Kingdom in the Sun, 1130-1194. Longmans. London, 1970. ISBN 978-0-582-12735-7
