= New Forest Academy =

Location
- Long Lane; Holbury, Hampshire, SO45 2PA; England
- Coordinates: 50.8369°N 1.3876°W

Information
- Type: Academy
- Department for Education URN: 138585 Tables
- Ofsted: Reports
- Principal: Rob Forder
- Gender: Coeducational
- Age: 11 to 18
- Website: https://newforestacademy.org/

New Forest Academy is a coeducational secondary school and with academy status, located in Holbury in the English county of Hampshire.

Previously known as Hardley School, it converted to academy status in September 2012 and was renamed New Forest Academy. It was formerly a foundation school administered by Hampshire County Council. The school continues to coordinate with Hampshire County Council for admissions.

New Forest Academy is sponsored by the Academies Enterprise Trust. The school offers GCSEs and BTECs as programmes of study for pupils.
