= Fawley, Hampshire =

Village and parish in Hampshire, England

Coordinates: 50.828°N 1.352°W

Fawley
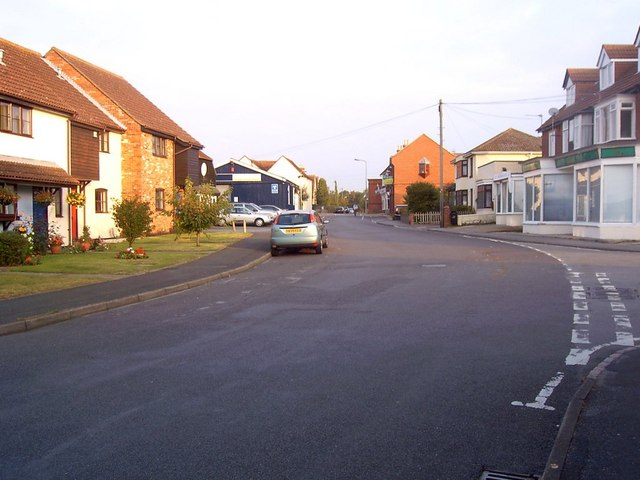
- Calshot Road, Fawley

- Location within Hampshire
- OS grid reference: SU457034
- Civil parish: Fawley
- District: New Forest
- Shire county: Hampshire
- Region: South East
- Country: England
- Sovereign state: United Kingdom
- Post town: SOUTHAMPTON
- Postcode district: SO45
- Dialling code: 023
- Police: Hampshire and Isle of Wight
- Fire: Hampshire and Isle of Wight
- Ambulance: South Central
- UK Parliament: New Forest East

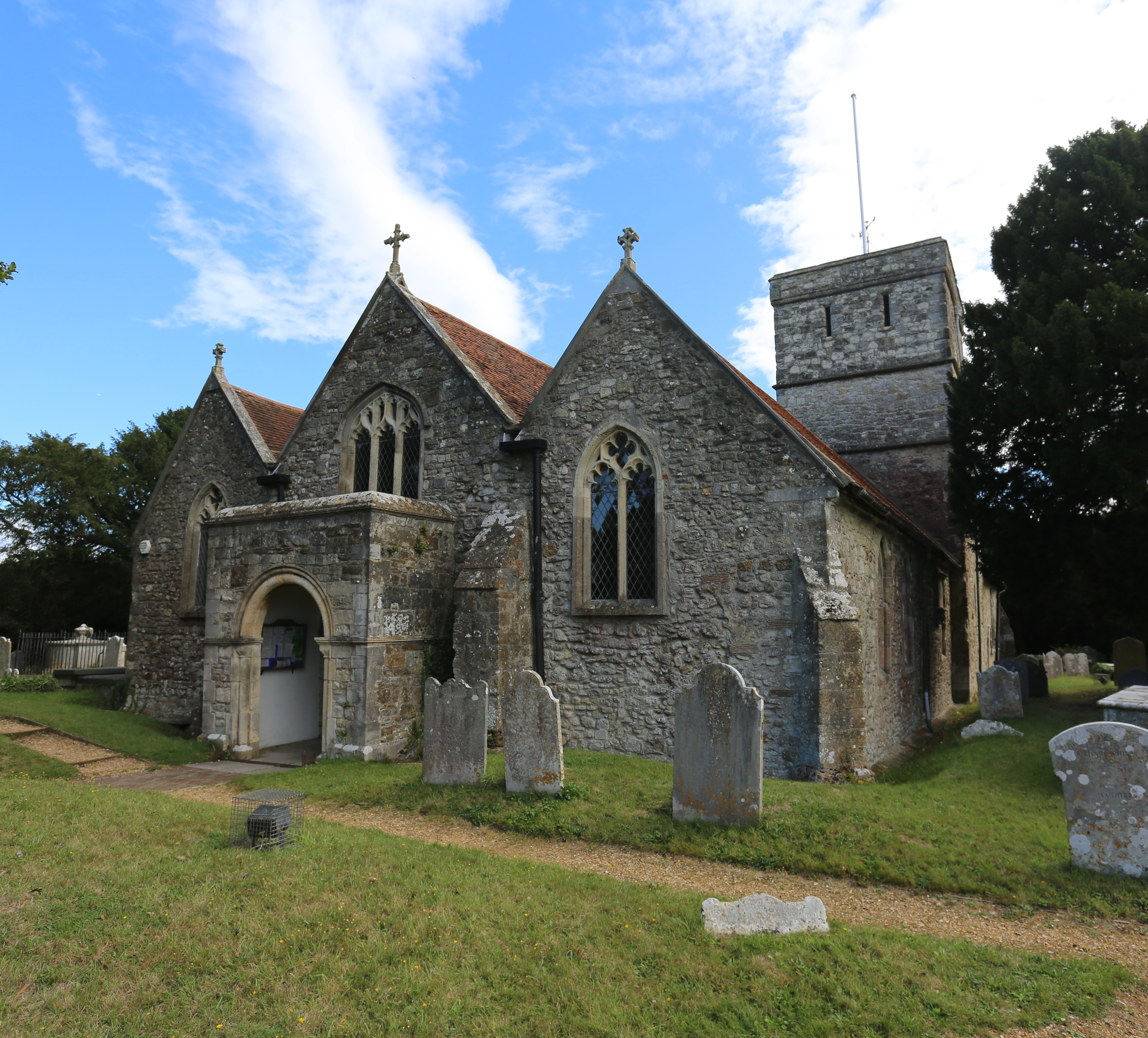
All Saints, Fawley

Fawley is a village and civil parish in Hampshire, England. It is situated in the New Forest on the western shore of the Solent, approximately 7 miles (11 kilometres) south of Southampton. Fawley is also the site of Fawley Refinery, operated by ExxonMobil, which is the largest facility of its kind in the United Kingdom. The decommissioned Fawley Power Station is also located less than a mile to the south east of the village.

== The village of Fawley ==
A settlement has existed at Fawley for many centuries, and the village itself was recorded in the Domesday Book. Other areas in the parish can boast remains from the Stone Age and Roman occupation. A church at Fawley apparently existed in 971. The present church (All Saints) was built between 1170 and 1340. This church still exists and is the parish church of much of the surrounding area.

The arrival of the Esso oil refinery in 1921 transformed a sparsely populated agricultural area into an industrial centre with a population of around 14,500. Modern Fawley is smaller and less populous than its more recently founded neighbours, Holbury and Blackfield, but remains the administrative centre of the parish. Other villages within the parish of Fawley include Hardley (a suburb of Holbury), Langley (a suburb of Blackfield), Ashlett, and Calshot. Calshot possesses shingle beaches and attracts significant numbers of tourists and local visitors during the summer months. Near Calshot is Luttrell's Tower, an 18th-century Gothic folly.

== History ==
The origin of the name "Fawley" is uncertain. It might mean "fallow(-coloured) wood/clearing" or "clearing with land broken in for arable".

In Domesday Book of 1086 Fawley is listed among those lands which were held by the Bishop of Winchester for the support of the monks of Winchester. In 1284 the monks gave up all their rights in Fawley to the bishop. There seems to have been a close connexion between Fawley Manor and the manor of Bitterne, which also belonged to the bishops of Winchester. In 1546 John Skullard was tenant at Fawley Manor, which remained in the hands of that family until 1681. In 1705 the manor was conveyed to Edward Peachey, and a family settlement concerning Fawley Manor was made by William and Erlysman Peachy in 1765. In 1801 the manor was conveyed to Robert Drummond of Cadlands. Fawley thus became annexed to the neighbouring manor of Cadlands.

The manor of Cadlands was in the 13th century attached to the lordship of the Isle of Wight until the end of the century when the overlordship was sold to the Crown. The manor was held from 1241 onwards by Titchfield Abbey until the Dissolution of the Monasteries. Sometime after 1560 the manor was combined with the estates of Holbury and Langley, and it subsequently fell into two moieties. One moiety was in the possession of the Stanley family from 1693 onwards, the other moiety passed to Lady Mary Talbot, and thence after 1772 into Drummond family. The Cadland estate, which stretched down the coast of Southampton Water for nearly eight miles, was the residence of the Drummond family, who owned most of the land in the parish. Cadland house was built in 1773, but was greatly enlarged in 1836; it burnt down in 1916 but was rebuilt in 1935. It was subsequently demolished with the growth of Fawley oil refinery which is built over much of the old Cadlands estate.

Three other estates in the parish are those of Ower, Stanswood, and Stone, all of which are recorded in the Domesday Book of 1086, and still exist as farms in the south of the parish. With a size of 37 households, Stanswood was in fact the largest settlement in the area in 1086.

=== Notable people ===
- Edward Unwin (1864–1950), recipient of the Victoria Cross
- Revd William Gibson (1804–1862), parish priest, father of:

Arthur Sumner Gibson (1844–1927), England rugby union international, born in Fawley
Edgar Charles Sumner Gibson (1848–1924), Bishop of Gloucester, born in Fawley
John Sumner Gibson (1833–1892), English clergyman and cricketer

== Sport and leisure ==
Fawley has a Non-League football club Fawley A.F.C., which plays at the Waterside Sports & Social Club. The formerly known Waterside Sports and Social Club (casually known as the Esso club) suffered financial difficulties, however ExxonMobil and Holbury Community Sports Association (HCSA) plan to refurbish the site and keep the changing rooms, tennis courts, and other facilities still running.

Fawley also has a Rugby union team, Fawley RFC, who play out of Newlands Park close to Fawley, having left their former home ground at the Esso club as of 2016. They currently play in Hampshire Division 1 having gained promotion at the end of 2018 - 2019 season.

== Fawley oil refinery and chemical works ==
A refinery at Fawley was first established in 1921 by the Atlantic Gulf and West Indies Company. It was acquired by Esso in 1925, and it was rebuilt and extended in 1951. It is the largest oil refinery in the United Kingdom with a capacity of 330,000 barrels a day.
