= George Drewry =

English recipient of the Victoria Cross

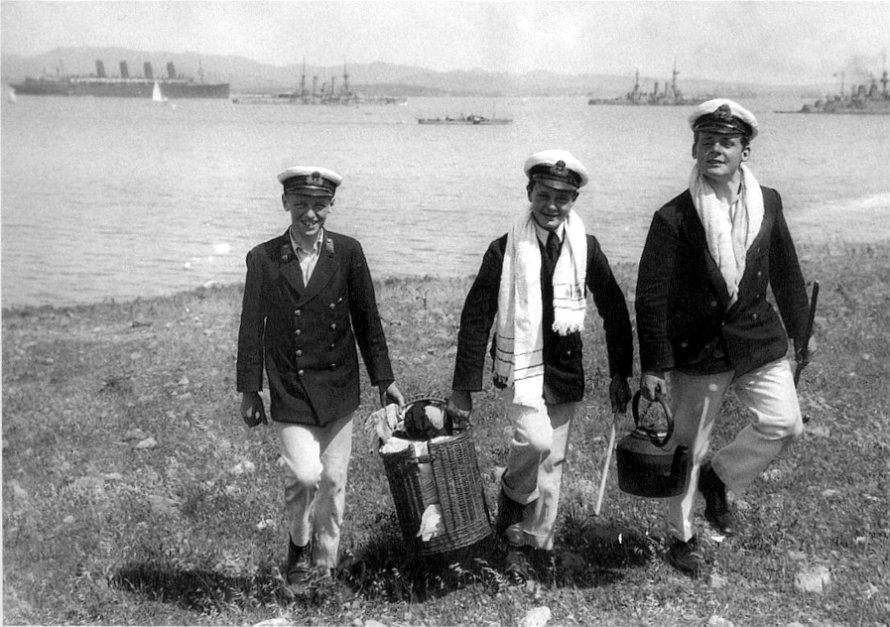
- Drewry (right) with fellow midshipmen Wilfred St. Aubyn Malleson and Greg Russell on Imbros. Photo by Ernest Brooks.
- Born: 3 November 1894; Forest Gate, Essex, England
- Died: 2 August 1918 (aged 23); Scapa Flow, Orkney, Scotland
- Burial place: City of London Cemetery, Manor Park
- Military career
- Allegiance: United Kingdom
- Branch: Royal Navy
- Service years: 1913 - 1918
- Rank: Lieutenant
- Units: SS River Clyde
- Conflicts: World War I
- Awards: Victoria Cross

George Leslie Drewry VC (3 November 1894 – 2 August 1918) was an English recipient of the Victoria Cross, the highest and most prestigious award for gallantry in the face of the enemy that can be awarded to British and Commonwealth forces.

Drewry was born on 3 November 1894 to Thomas and Mary Drewry. He joined the Naval Reserve in 1913, and was called up for service at the start of World War I.

As a 20-year-old midshipman in the Royal Naval Reserve during the First World War, he was awarded the Victoria Cross for his actions on 25 April 1915 at V Beach in the Landing at Cape Helles, during the Gallipoli campaign.

He later achieved the rank of lieutenant and was killed in an accident at Scapa Flow, Orkney Islands, on 2 August 1918.

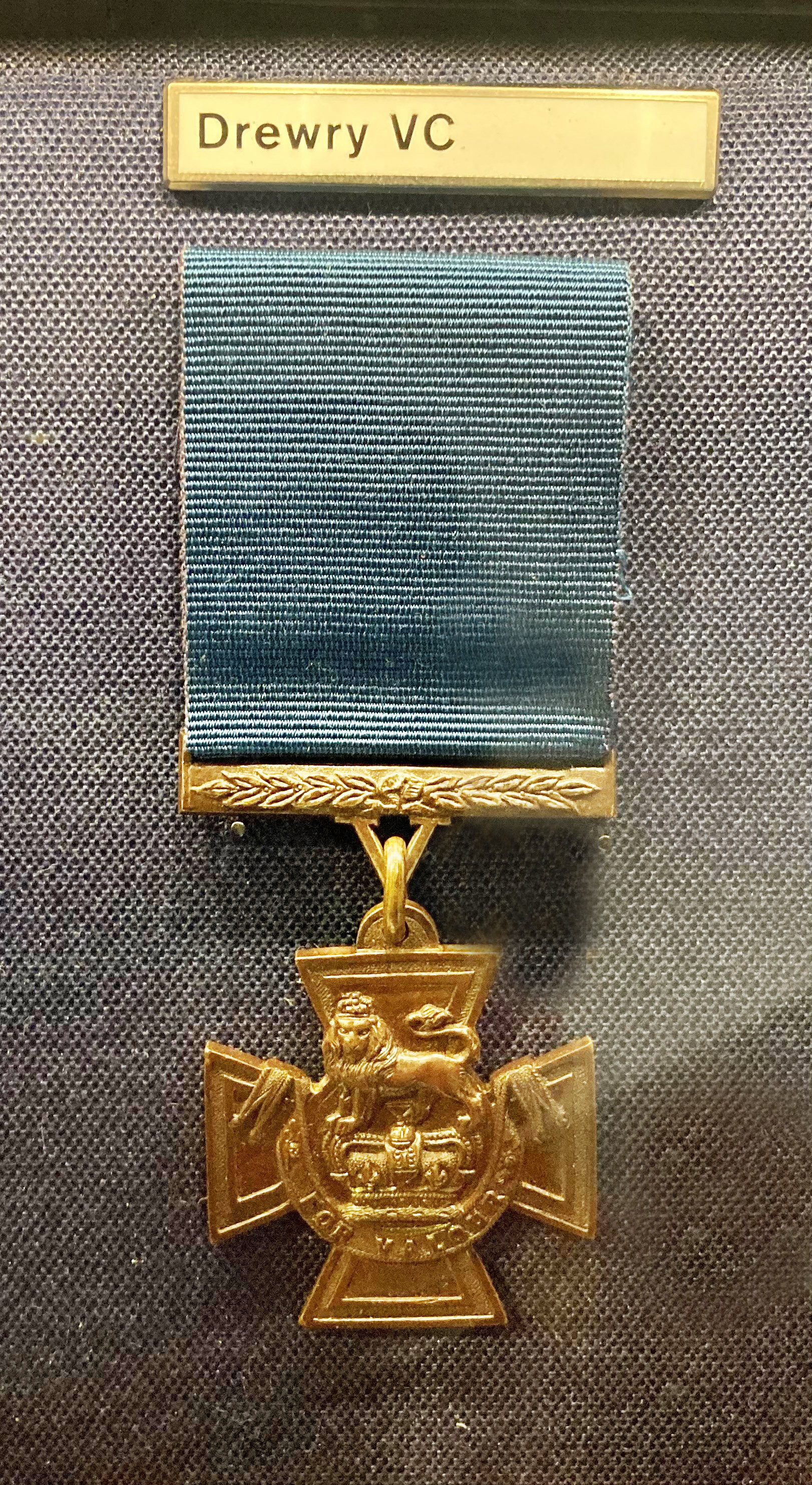
Victoria Cross awarded to Midshipman George Drewry on display in the Lord Ashcroft Exhibition of the Imperial War Museum, London

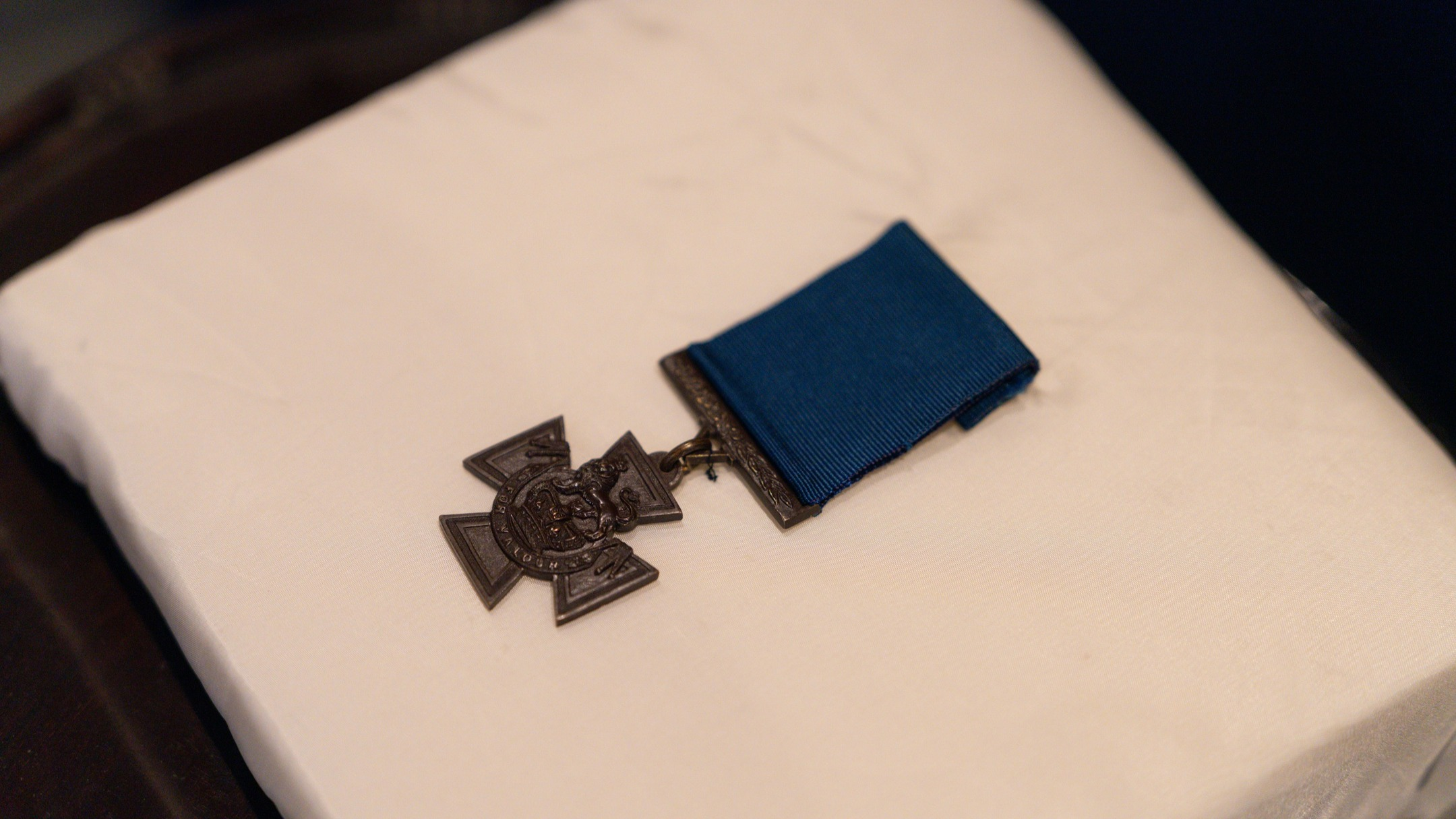
The Drewry VC on display during its return ceremony to Merchant Taylors' School

Since 27 November 2025, his Victoria Cross has been displayed at Merchant Taylors' School, his old school, after 29 years at the IWM.

== Citation ==
Assisted Commander Unwin at the work of securing the lighters under heavy rifle and maxim fire. He was wounded in the head, but continued his work and twice subsequently attempted to swim from lighter to lighter with a line.

— The London Gazette, No. 29264, 13 August 1915
