= Arthur Tisdall =

British recipient of the Victoria Cross (1890–1915)

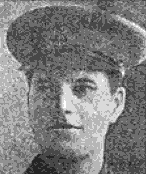
- Born: 21 July 1890; Bombay, British India
- Died: 6 May 1915 (aged 24); Achi Baba, Gallipoli, Ottoman Turkey
- Burial place: No known grave
- Military career
- Allegiance: United Kingdom
- Branch: Royal Navy
- Service years: 1914–1915
- Rank: Sub-Lieutenant
- Units: 13 Platoon, D Company, Anson Battalion, Royal Naval Division
- Conflicts: World War I: Gallipoli campaign; Landing at Cape Helles; Landing at V Beach; Krithia campaign; Second Battle of Krithia †
- Awards: Victoria Cross

Arthur Walderne St Clair Tisdall VC (21 July 1890 – 6 May 1915) was a British recipient of the Victoria Cross, the highest and most prestigious award for gallantry in the face of the enemy that can be awarded to British and Commonwealth forces.

== Life ==
Tisdall was born in Bombay, British India in 1890, and after emigrating attended Bedford School from 1900 to 1909. He went to university at Trinity College, Cambridge, where he rowed and attended the Officer Training Corps in his spare time. He attained a double first in classics.

Tisdall joined the Royal Naval Volunteer Reserve when he was 24 years old, at the outbreak of the First World War. He enlisted as an Able Seaman at HMS President, the home of the London Division of the Royal Naval Reserve, but was soon promoted to Sub Lieutenant.

On the first day of the Gallipoli landings (25 April 1915) at V Beach, Gallipoli, during the landing from SS River Clyde, Tisdall heard wounded men on the beach calling for help. The men were under heavy machine gun fire from entrenched Turkish forces. He jumped into the water, and pushing a boat in front of him, went to their rescue. He found, however, that he could not manage alone, but managed to enlist the help of first one, and then three more naval personnel. They made five trips from the ship to the shore and were responsible for rescuing several wounded men under heavy and accurate fire, until darkness forced them to stop.

He was mortally wounded by a sniper during the Second Battle of Krithia at Achi Baba on 6 May 1915, and was buried where he fell, but today has no known grave.

== Bibliography ==
- Snelling, Stephen (2012) [1995]. Gallipoli. VCs of the First World War. The History Press. ISBN 978-0752456539.
- VCs of the First World War - The Naval VCs (Stephen Snelling, 2002)
