= Garth Walford =

Recipient of the Victoria Cross

Garth Neville Walford
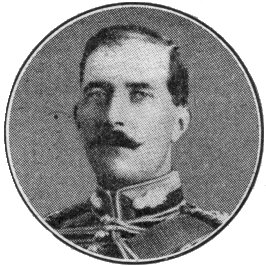
- Born: 27 May 1882; Camberley, Surrey, England
- Died: 26 April 1915 (aged 32); V Beach, Cape Helles, Gallipoli, Ottoman Empire
- Burial place: V Beach Commonwealth War Graves Commission Cemetery
- Military career
- Allegiance: United Kingdom
- Branch: British Army
- Service years: 1902–1915 †
- Rank: Captain
- Units: Royal Field Artillery
- Conflicts: World War I: Gallipoli campaign; Landing at Cape Helles; Landing at V Beach †
- Awards: Victoria Cross

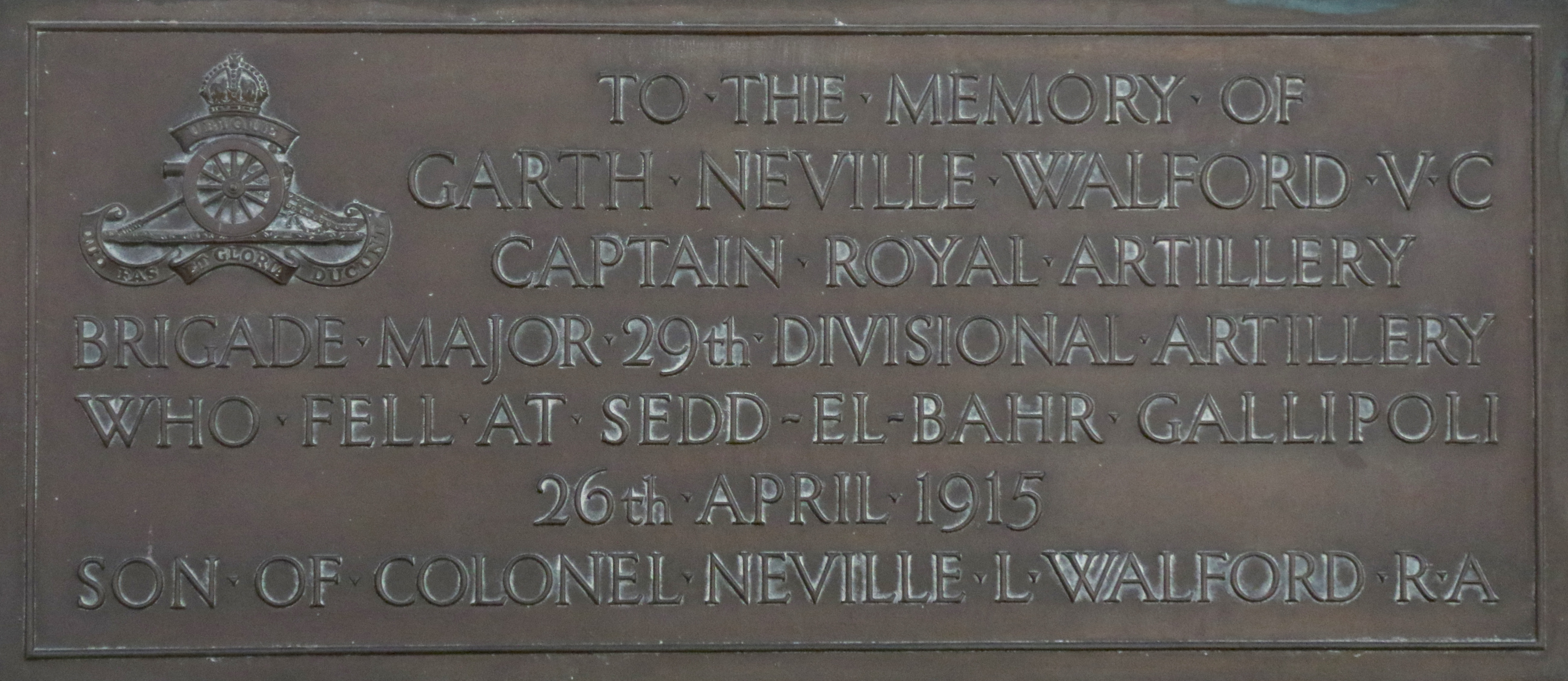
Memorial in Exeter Cathedral

Captain Garth Neville Walford VC (27 May 1882 – 26 April 1915) was a British Army officer and recipient of the Victoria Cross, the highest and most prestigious award for gallantry in the face of the enemy that can be awarded to British and Commonwealth forces.

== Biography ==
Walford was born to Colonel Neville Walford (Royal Artillery) and his wife at No 5, The Terrace in Camberley, which is now part of the Royal Military Academy Sandhurst.

Walford was listed as a ′University Candidate′ when he was commissioned into the British Army as a second lieutenant in the Royal Field Artillery on 24 December 1902.

He had advanced to captain during the First World War, and was awarded a Victoria Cross for his actions on 26 April 1915 at the V Beach, Gallipoli, Turkey. After his senior officers had been killed, Walford and Charles Hotham Montagu Doughty-Wylie organised a successful attack targeted on the old fort at the top of the hill, although both men were killed in the battle.

Walford was 32 years old when he died, and married to Elizabeth Walford. He is buried in V Beach Cemetery.

== Citation ==
On 26th April, 1915, subsequent to a landing having been effected on the beach at a point on the Gallipoli Peninsula, during which both Brigadier-General and Brigade Major had been killed, Lieutenant-Colonel Doughty-Wylie and Captain Walford organised and led an attack through and on both sides of the village of Sedd el Bahr on the Old Castle at the top of the hill inland. The enemy's position was very strongly held and entrenched, and defended with concealed machine-guns and pom-poms. It was mainly due to the initiative, skill and great gallantry of these two Officers that the attack was a complete success. Both were killed in the moment of victory.

— The London Gazette, No. 29202, 22 June 1915

== Bibliography ==
- Snelling, Stephen (2012) [1995]. Gallipoli. VCs of the First World War. The History Press. ISBN 978-0752456539.
