= V Beach Commonwealth War Graves Commission Cemetery =

WWI CWGC cemetery in Gallipoli, Turkey

V Beach
- Commonwealth War Graves Commission
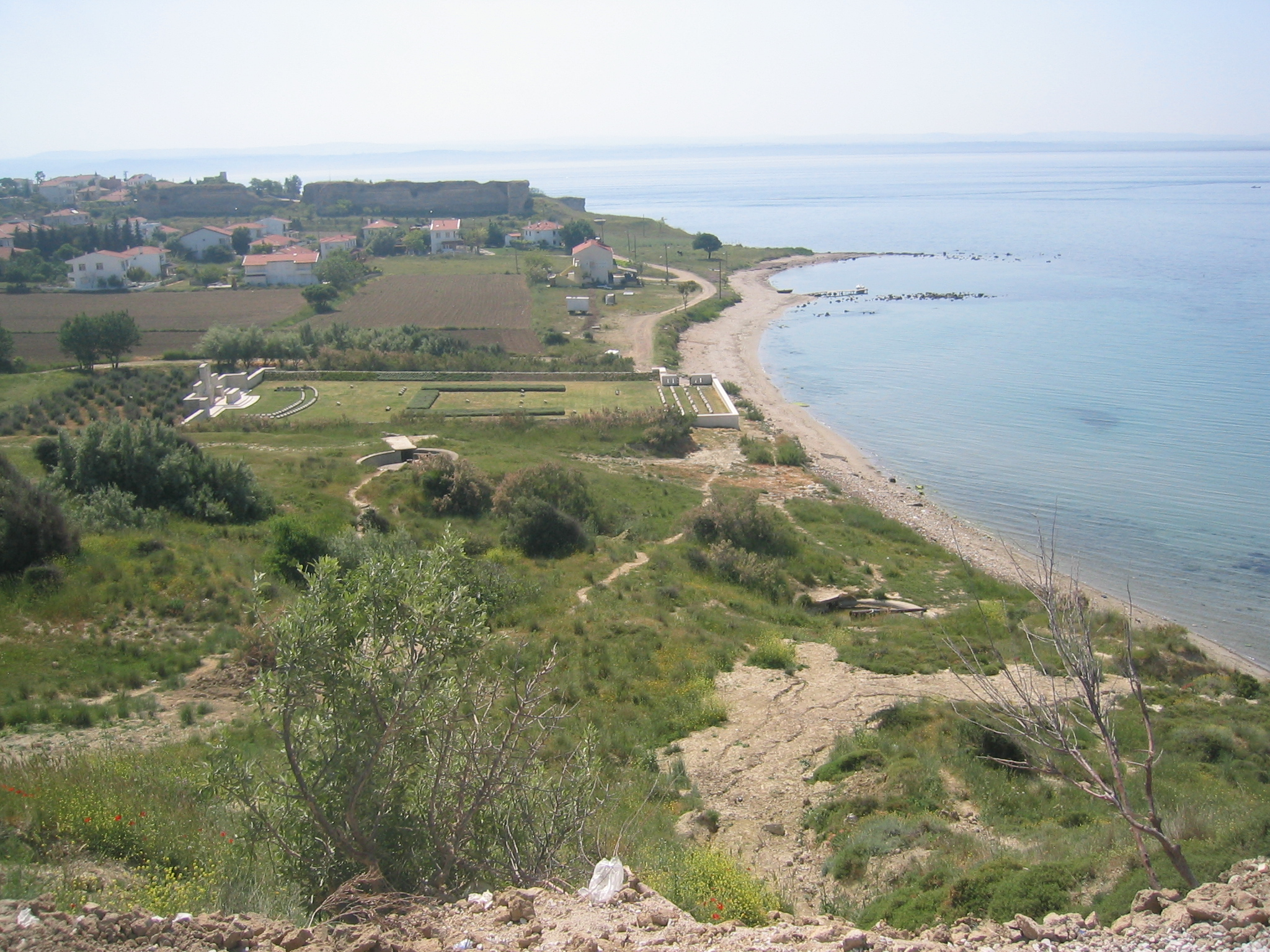
- Used for those deceased April 1915–January 1916
- Established: 1915
- Location: 40.0436°N 26.1835°E near Seddülbahir, Turkey
- Total burials: 696
- Unknowns: 480

Burials by nation
- Allied Powers: United Kingdom: 696

Burials by war
- World War I: 696

V Beach Cemetery is a Commonwealth War Graves Commission cemetery located near Cape Helles, Gallipoli, Turkey.

The cemetery was brought into use shortly after the landing at Cape Helles at the end of April 1915 and its use ceased in May 1915. An additional 13 graves were moved into it in 1919 following the Armistice. As well as the 20 known graves, there are memorials to a further 196 soldiers and sailors who are known to be buried in the cemetery. In its overall capacity, the gravesite contains the remains of 696 soldiers.

== Notable graves ==
Among the graves is that of Captain Garth Walford who was posthumously awarded the Victoria Cross (along with Lieutenant-Colonel Charles Doughty-Wylie) for organising and leading an attack through Seddülbahir and the fort adjacent to the cemetery.
