= Achi Baba =

Landform in Turkey, defense in the Gallipoli campaign

Coordinates: 40.09639°N 26.22604°E

Achi Baba (Turkish: Alçıtepe) is a height dominating the Gallipoli Peninsula in Turkey, located in Çanakkale Province. Achi Baba was the main position of the Ottoman Turkish defenses in 1915 during the World War I Gallipoli campaign. Mediterranean Expeditionary Force Commander-in-Chief Sir Ian Hamilton had set the capture of Achi Baba as a stated priority for operations during the Allied landing at Cape Helles on 25 April 1915. Four separate attempts were made by the Allies to seize Achi Baba and the village of Krithia between April and July, but the heights remained in Turkish hands for the duration of the campaign.

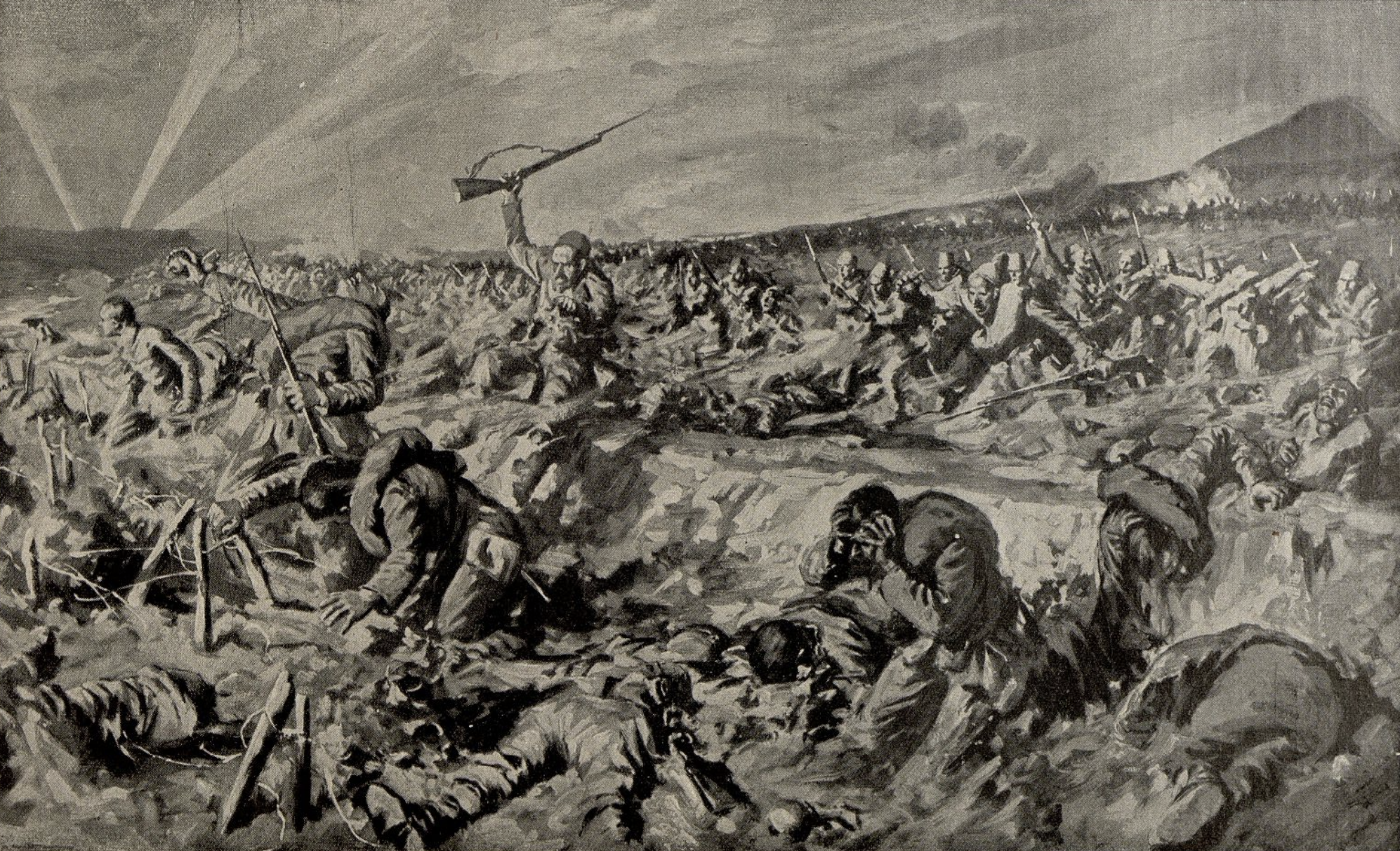
Night attack by Turkish troops on the left wing of the English positions near Achi Baba on Gallipoli (A. C. Michael)

Achi Baba is referenced in the closing stanza of the following poem published in 1915:

On Achi Baba's rock their bones
Whiten, and on Flanders' plain,
But of their travailings and groans
Poetry is born again.

— from 'A Renascence' by Robert Graves

== See also ==
- Krithia, nearby, also called Alçıtepe in Turkish

== Sources ==
- Merriam-Webster's Geographical Dictionary, Third Edition. Springfield, Massachusetts: Merriam-Webster Inc., 1997. ISBN 0-87779-546-0.
