= HMS Octavia =

Three ships of the British Royal Navy have been named HMS Octavia:

- HMS Octavia (1849), a 50-gun fourth rate launched in August 1849 and converted to a screw frigate in 1861. Broken up in 1876.
- HMS Octavia (1916), an Admiralty M-class destroyer originally named HMS Oryx but renamed whilst under construction. Launched in June 1916 and sold in November 1921.
- HMS Octavia (J290), an Algerine-class minesweeper launched in December 1942 and sold for breaking up in April 1950.
