= HMS Oberon =

Six ships of the Royal Navy have been named HMS Oberon, after the fairy king Oberon from William Shakespeare's play, A Midsummer Night's Dream:

- HMS Oberon (1805) was a 16-gun brig-sloop launched in 1805 and broken up in 1816.
- HMS Oberon (1847) was an Antelope-class iron paddle sloop launched in 1847, used as a gunnery target after 1870, sunk in 1874 during experiments with naval mines, raised in 1875 and sold in 1880. In 1870 she was used for underwater firings of Whitehead torpedoes.
- HMS Oberon was a coastguard vessel, previously the civilian Lady Ailne. She was launched in 1884, purchased in 1888, and renamed Oberon. She was renamed Hawk later that year, and then Undine in 1904. She was sold in 1906.
- HMS Oberon (1916) was an Admiralty M-class destroyer launched in 1916 and sold for scrap in 1921.
- HMS Oberon (P21) was an Odin-class submarine launched in 1926 and broken up in 1945.
- HMS Oberon (S09) was the lead ship of her class of submarines, launched in 1959, sold in 1987 and broken up in 1991.
