= HMS Offa =

Two ships of the Royal Navy have borne the name HMS Offa, after Offa of Mercia. A third was renamed before being launched:

- HMS Offa was a Talisman-class destroyer, originally under construction for the Turkish Navy. She was taken over and renamed HMS Offa, but was launched as HMS Trident in 1915.
- HMS Offa (1916) was an Admiralty M-class destroyer launched in 1916 and sold in 1921.
- HMS Offa (G29) was an O-class destroyer launched in 1941. She was sold to the Pakistani Navy in 1949 and renamed Tariq. She was scrapped in 1959.
