= HMS Osiris =

Three ships and one shore establishment of the Royal Navy have borne the name HMS Osiris, after the Egyptian god Osiris:

- HMS Osiris (1916) was an Admiralty M-class destroyer launched in 1916 and sold in 1921.
- HMS Osiris (N67) was an Odin-class submarine launched in 1928 and sold in 1946, being broken up in 1952.
- HMS Osiris (S13) was an Oberon-class submarine launched in 1962 and sold to Canada in 1992, where she was dismantled for spare parts and broken up that year.
- HMS Osiris (shore establishment) was a shore establishment in Egypt in the late 1940s/early 1950s.
