= HMS Manners (1915) =

British M-Class destroyer

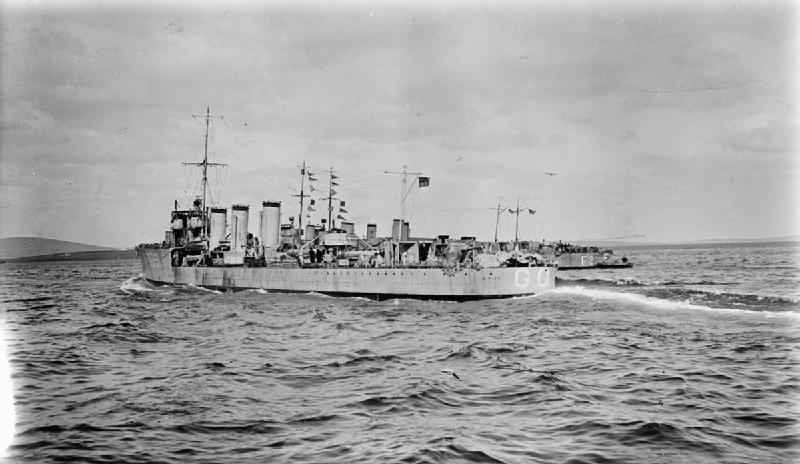
- Sister ship Minion

History

United Kingdom
- Name: Manners
- Ordered: September 1914
- Builder: Fairfield, Govan
- Launched: 15 June 1915
- Completed: 21 September 1915
- Out of service: 26 October 1921
- Fate: Sold to be broken up

General characteristics
- Class & type: Admiralty M-class destroyer
- Displacement: 886 long tons (900 t) (normal)
- Length: 273 ft 4 in (83.3 m) (o/a); 265 feet (80.8 m) (p.p.)
- Beam: 26 ft 8 in (8.1 m)
- Draught: 8 ft 11 in (2.7 m)
- Installed power: 3 Yarrow boilers, 25,000 shp (19,000 kW)
- Propulsion: Brown-Curtiss steam turbines, 3 shafts
- Speed: 34 knots (63 km/h; 39 mph)
- Range: 2,530 nmi (4,690 km; 2,910 mi) at 15 kn (28 km/h; 17 mph)
- Complement: 80
- Armament: 3 × single QF 4-inch (102 mm) guns; 2 × single 1-pdr 37 mm (1.5 in) AA guns; 2 × twin 21 in (533 mm) torpedo tubes

HMS Manners was an Admiralty M-class destroyer which served in the British Royal Navy during the First World War. The M class was an improvement on those of the preceding L class, capable of higher speed. Launched in 1915, the destroyer joined the Eleventh Destroyer Flotilla of the Grand Fleet and, in 1916, responded with the Grand Fleet to the bombardment of Yarmouth and Lowestoft. During the Battle of Jutland in 1916, the destroyer saw action against German light cruisers and, as the evening fell, attacked the German battle line, but recorded no hits. During the following year, the vessel attacked a German submarine during an anti-submarine patrol but did not score a hit. Later in the war, the ship was transferred to the Coast of Ireland Station at Buncrana and escorted convoys at the start of their journey from ports on the Clyde and Mersey or at the end of their journey across the Atlantic Ocean. After the 1918 Armistice that ended the war, Manners was placed in reserve before being sold to be broken up in 1921.

== Design and development ==
Manners was one of the sixteen Admiralty M-class destroyers ordered by the British Admiralty in September 1914 as part of the First War Programme. The M class was an improved version of the earlier L class, required to reach a higher speed in order to counter rumoured new German fast destroyers. The remit was to have a maximum speed of 36 knots (67 km/h; 41 mph) and, although ultimately the destroyers fell short of that ambition in service, the greater performance that was achieved was valued by the navy. It transpired that the rumoured German warships did not exist.

The destroyer had a length of 265 ft (80.8 m) between perpendiculars and 273 ft 4 in (83.3 m) overall, with a beam of 26 ft 8 in (8.1 m) and draught of 8 ft 11 in (2.7 m). Normal displacement was 886 long tons (900 t). Power was provided by three Yarrow boilers feeding Brown-Curtiss steam turbines rated at 25,000 shaft horsepower (19,000 kW), driving three shafts and exhausting through three funnels. Design speed was 34 knots (63 km/h; 39 mph), but Manners managed 34.32 knots (63.56 km/h; 39.49 mph) on 24,500 shp (18,300 kW) during trials. A total of 228 long tons (232 t) of oil was carried, which gave a design range of 2,530 nautical miles (4,690 km; 2,910 mi) at 15 knots (28 km/h; 17 mph). The ship had a complement of 80 officers and ratings.

Manners had a main armament consisting of three single QF 4-inch (102 mm) Mk IV guns on the centreline, with one on the forecastle, one aft on a raised platform and one between the middle and aft funnels. Torpedo armament consisted of two twin torpedo tubes for 21 in (533 mm) torpedoes located aft of the funnels. Two single 1-pounder 37 mm (1.5 in) "pom-pom" anti-aircraft guns were carried. The anti-aircraft guns were later replaced by single 2-pdr 40 mm (1.6 in) "pom-pom" guns. The destroyer was fitted with racks and storage for depth charges. Initially, only two depth charges were carried but the number increased in service and by 1918, the vessel was carrying between 30 and 50 depth charges.

== Construction and career ==
Manners was laid down by Fairfield Shipbuilding and Engineering Company at their yard in Govan, was launched on 15 June 1915 and was completed three months later on 21 September 1915. The vessel was the first of the name to serve with the Royal Navy.

Manners was deployed as part of the Grand Fleet, joining the Eleventh Destroyer Flotilla. On 26 and 27 February 1916, the flotilla took part in a large naval exercise east of Shetland, involving four flotillas of destroyers, as well as all the operational battlecruisers, battleships and cruisers of the Grand Fleet. The exercise was deemed a success. On 24 April, the destroyer was based at Cromarty on the east coast of Scotland. The flotilla formed part of the support for the Grand Fleet in their response to the German bombardment of Yarmouth and Lowestoft which took place on that day. However, the slower speed of the destroyers in the choppy seas meant that they were left behind and they did not encounter the German fleet.

During the following month, the destroyer sailed back to Cromarty along with eight other destroyers from the flotilla and the flotilla leader Kempenfelt to meet with the Second Battle Squadron. The ships sortied to rendezvous with the remainder of the Eleventh Destroyer Flotilla under the light cruiser Castor on 31 May. They then sailed along with the rest of the Grand Fleet to confront the German High Seas Fleet in the Battle of Jutland. As the two fleets converged, the flotilla briefly was called away hunt for imaginary submarines. Before they met, the flotilla was formed close to the dreadnought battleship King George V, which was leading at the head of the Second Battle Squadron. At 21:00, the destroyers encountered heavy German units and very nearly attacked, but broke off due to fears they were British battlecruisers. According to John Campbell, ""the powerful 11th Flotilla missed a fine opportunity...of inflicting serious damage". As the German fleet withdrew during the night, the destroyers, led by Castor, is believed to have come under fire from SMS König at 23:45. They attacked the German light cruisers of the Fourth Scouting Group, although Manners again was not able to achieve any hits. The engagement led them away from the battle, opening the way for the German fleet to escape. In the action, Manners took no hits. After the battle ended, the vessel returned to Scapa Flow with the remainder of the flotilla, arriving on 2 June. On 14 June, the flotilla escorted King George V aboard the battleship Royal Oak when he visited the Grand Fleet there.

On 18 August, the flotilla again sailed with the Grand Fleet under the battleship Iron Duke to seek out the German fleet. The fleets again failed to meet in battle in the subsequent action of 19 August. The destroyer remained with the Eleventh Destroyer Flotilla into 1917. Although still attached to the Grand Fleet and based at Scapa Flow, the destroyers were often unavailable to the fleet due to work in anti-submarine patrols. These rarely led to a kill. On 24 September, while on patrol off Orkney, the destroyer spotted the conning tower of a submarine approximately 18 mi (29 km) north of Pentland Skerries and 5,000 yd (4,600 m) ahead of the ship. The crew responded quickly but the submarine submerged while the ship was 1.5 mi (2.4 km) away. Manners dropped a single depth charge, but the submarine escaped.

Increasingly, patrols did not provide the security needed to shipping and the Admiralty redeployed the destroyers to act as escorts for convoys, which proved more effective. Manners was redeployed to the Northern Division of the Coast of Ireland Station at Buncrana in early 1918. The destroyer was part of the escort service provided to convoys travelling across the Atlantic Ocean. The destroyers at Buncrana assisted convoys travelling across the Atlantic Ocean to and from the American industrial complex at Hampton Roads and via Sydney, Nova Scotia, arriving and departing ports on the Clyde and Mersey. The division also provided three escorts every eight days to protect fast convoys travelling to and from Halifax, Nova Scotia.

After the Armistice that ended the war on 11 November 1918, the Royal Navy returned to a peacetime level of strength and both the number of ships and personnel needed to be reduced to save money. Along nearly two dozen other members of the class, the destroyer was transferred to reserve at the Nore. However, the harsh conditions of wartime operations, particularly the combination of high speed and the poor weather that is typical of the North Sea, exacerbated by the fact that the hull was not galvanised, meant that the ship was already worn out. Manners was declared superfluous to operational requirements and retired. On 26 October 1921, the destroyer was sold to Barking Ship Breaking Company and broken up.

== Pennant numbers ==
Pennant number	Date
HA9	August 1915
G03	January 1918
HC1	June 1918
G84	January 1919
