= HMS Medina (1916) =

British M-Class destroyer, WW1

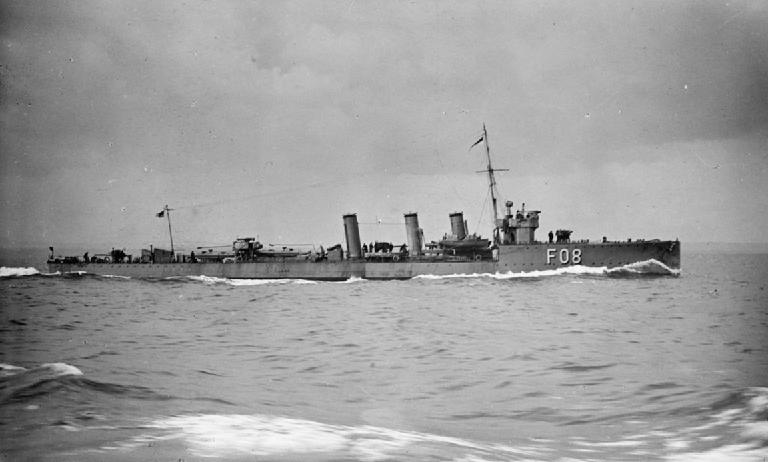
- Sistership HMS Oracle

History

United Kingdom
- Name: HMS Medina
- Namesake: River Medina
- Ordered: May 1915
- Builder: J. Samuel White, East Cowes
- Yard number: 1467
- Laid down: 23 September 1915
- Launched: 8 March 1916
- Completed: 30 June 1916
- Out of service: 9 May 1921
- Fate: Broken up

General characteristics
- Class & type: Admiralty M-class destroyer
- Displacement: 937 long tons (952 t) (normal)
- Length: 265 ft (80.8 m) (o.a.)
- Beam: 26 ft 8 in (8.1 m)
- Draught: 8 ft 11 in (2.7 m)
- Installed power: 3 White-Forster boilers, 25,000 shp (19,000 kW)
- Propulsion: 3 Parsons steam turbines, 3 shafts
- Speed: 34 knots (39.1 mph; 63.0 km/h)
- Range: 2,280 nmi (4,220 km) at 17 kn (31 km/h)
- Complement: 80
- Armament: 3 × single QF 4-inch (102 mm) Mark IV guns; 1 × single 2-pdr 40 mm (1.6 in) AA gun; 2 × twin 21 in (533 mm) torpedo tubes

HMS Medina was a Admiralty M-class destroyer which served with the Royal Navy during the First World War. The M class were an improvement on the previous L class, capable of higher speed. Originally laid down as HMS Redmill by J. Samuel White at East Cowes on the Isle of Wight, the vessel was renamed before being launched in 1916. The ship was allocated to the Grand Fleet and spent much of its service in anti-submarine warfare, either escorting convoys or involved in submarine hunting patrols. Although the destroyer attacked a number of German submarines, none were sunk. After the War, Medina was reassigned to a defence flotilla in Portsmouth and was eventually sold to be broken up in 1921.

== Design and development ==
Medina was one of eighteen Admiralty M-class destroyer destroyers ordered by the British Admiralty in May 1915 as part of the Fifth War Construction Programme. The M class was an improved version of the earlier L-class destroyers, required to reach a higher speed in order to counter rumoured German fast destroyers. The remit was to have a maximum speed of 36 knots (67 km/h; 41 mph) and, although the eventual design did not achieve this, the greater performance was appreciated by the navy. It transpired that the German ships did not exist.

The destroyer had a length of 265 feet (80.8 m) between perpendiculars and 273 feet 4 inches (83 m) overall, with a beam of 26 feet 8 inches (8.1 m) and a draught of 8 feet 11 inches (2.7 m) at deep load. Displacement was 937 long tons (952 t) normal. Power was provided by three White-Forster boilers feeding three Parsons steam turbines rated at 25,000 shaft horsepower (19,000 kW) and driving three shafts, to give a design speed of 34 knots (63 km/h; 39 mph). The vessel achieved 33.5 knots (62.0 km/h; 38.6 mph) in trials. Three funnels were fitted. A total of 268 long tons (272 t) of oil could be carried, including 40 long tons (41 t) in peace tanks that were not used in wartime, giving a range of 2,280 nautical miles (4,220 km; 2,620 mi) at 17 knots (31 km/h; 20 mph).

Armament consisted of three single QF 4-inch (102 mm) Mk IV guns on the ship's centreline, with one on the forecastle, one aft on a raised platform and one between the middle and aft funnels on a bandstand. Torpedo armament consisted of two twin mounts for 21 in (533 mm) torpedoes. A single QF 2-pounder 40 mm (1.6 in) "pom-pom" anti-aircraft gun was mounted between the torpedo tubes. Medina was equipped with a paravane for anti-submarine warfare and minesweeping. The ship had a complement of 80 officers and ratings.

== Construction and career ==
Redmill was laid down by J. Samuel White at East Cowes on the Isle of Wight on 23 September 1915 with the yard number 1467, and launched on 8 March the folliowing year. The name recalled the achievements of Captain Robert Redmill of the Polyphemus. The ship was completed on 30 June 1916 and joined the Grand Fleet. By this time, the ship's name had already been changed to Medina.after the river. The vessel was deployed as part of the Grand Fleet, joining the Fourteenth Destroyer Flotilla based at Scapa Flow.

Still attached to the Fourteenth Destroyer Flotilla, early in 1917, the destroyer was transferred to Plymouth and allocated to anti-submarine patrols. During March, the ship was moved to Devonport, continuing to hunt for German submarines, although no submarines were sunk. On 23 and 24 April, the destroyer attacked both U-53 and U-61, but scored no hits. Later, on 9 June, the destroyer attacked U-70, but not before the merchant ship SS Appledore had been sunk. Later in the year, the ship was transferred to the Irish coast, serving with the Northern Division based in Buncrana. This service also involved confrontations with submarines, this time while escorting convoys. These were similarly unsuccessful and instead the crew had to watch, for example, the loss of the tanker SS Argalia on 6 August while under escort.

After the Armistice of 11 November 1918 that ended the war, Medina was transferred to the local defence flotilla at Portsmouth, attached to Fisguard. However, as the Royal Navy returned to a peacetime level of strength, both the number of ships and personnel needed to be reduced to save money. On 9 May 1921, Medina was sold to Thos. W. Ward of Milford Haven and subsequently broken up.

== Pennant numbers ==
| Pennant number | Date |
|---|---|
| G75 | September 1915 |
| G51 | January 1917 |
| G52 | January 1918 |
| D87 | November 1918 |
| F70 | January 1919 |
