= HMS Orcadia =

British M-Class destroyer

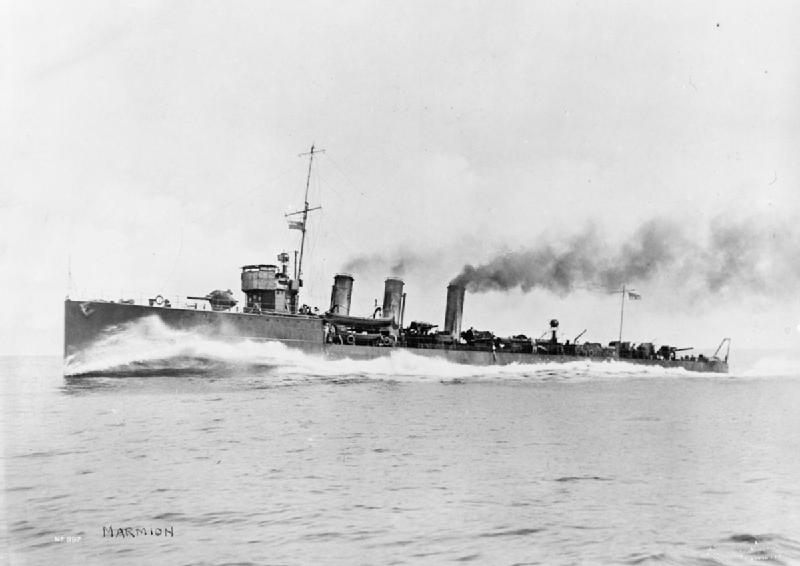
- Sister ship Marmion

History

United Kingdom
- Name: Orcadia
- Ordered: February 1915
- Builder: Fairfield, Govan
- Yard number: 518
- Laid down: 24 June 1915
- Launched: 26 July 1916
- Completed: 29 September 1916
- Out of service: 31 October 1921
- Fate: Sold to be broken up

General characteristics
- Class & type: Admiralty M-class destroyer
- Displacement: 948 long tons (963 t) (normal)
- Length: 273 ft 4 in (83.3 m) (o/a); 265 feet (80.8 m) (p.p.)
- Beam: 26 ft 8 in (8.1 m)
- Draught: 8 ft 11 in (2.7 m)
- Installed power: 3 Yarrow boilers, 27,800 shp (20,700 kW)
- Propulsion: Brown-Curtiss steam turbines, 3 shafts
- Speed: 34 knots (63 km/h; 39 mph)
- Range: 2,530 nmi (4,690 km; 2,910 mi) at 15 kn (28 km/h; 17 mph)
- Complement: 80
- Armament: 3 × single QF 4-inch (102 mm) guns; 2 × single 1-pdr 37 mm (1.5 in) AA guns; 2 × twin 21 in (533 mm) torpedo tubes

HMS Orcadia was a Repeat Admiralty M-class destroyer that served in the Royal Navy during the First World War. The M class was an improvement on those of the preceding L class, capable of higher speed. Orcadia had a largely uneventful war. Joining the Fifteenth Destroyer Flotilla of the Grand Fleet in 1917, the ship was dispatched from the flotilla to the naval base Portsmouth, serving with the Local Defence Flotilla. The destroyer was allocated to the paravave depot, operating there into 1918. The paravane was a weapon used in anti-submarine warfare and minesweeping, although it lost favour with the Royal Navy as the war progressed. After the Armistice that ended the war, Orcadia remained with the Local Defence Flotilla at Portsmouth and was sold in 1921 to be broken up.

== Design and development ==
Orcadia was one of 16 Repeat Admiralty M-class destroyers ordered by the British Admiralty in February 1915 as part of the Fourth War Programme soon after the start of the First World War. The M class was an improved version of the earlier L class, required to reach a higher speed in order to counter rumoured new German fast destroyers. The remit was to have a maximum speed of 36 knots (67 km/h; 41 mph) and, although ultimately the destroyers fell short of that ambition in service, the extra performance that was achieved was valued by the navy. It transpired that the German warships did not exist. The Repeat M class differed from the prewar vessels in having a raked stem and minor design improvements based on wartime experience.

The destroyer had a length of 265 ft (80.8 m) between perpendiculars and 273 ft 4 in (83.3 m) overall, with a beam of 26 ft 8 in (8.1 m) and draught of 8 ft 11 in (2.7 m). Displacement was 948 long tons (963 t) normal. Power was provided by three Yarrow boilers feeding Brown-Curtiss steam turbines rated at 27,800 shaft horsepower (20,700 kW). The turbines drove three shafts and exhausted through three funnels. Design speed was 34 knots (63 km/h; 39 mph), which the vessel exceeded on trials. A total of 228 long tons (232 t) of oil was carried to give a design range of 2,530 nautical miles (4,690 km; 2,910 mi) at 15 knots (28 km/h; 17 mph). The ship had a complement of 80 officers and ratings.

Orcadia had a main armament consisting of three single QF 4-inch (102 mm) Mk IV guns on the centreline, with one on the forecastle, one aft on a raised platform and one between the middle and aft funnels. Torpedo armament consisted of two twin torpedo tubes for 21 in (533 mm) torpedoes located aft of the funnels. Two single 1-pounder 37 mm (1.5 in) "pom-pom" anti-aircraft guns were carried. The anti-aircraft guns were later replaced by 2-pdr 40 mm (1.6 in) "pom-pom" guns and the destroyer was also fitted with racks and storage for depth charges. Initially, only two depth charges were carried but the number increased in service and by 1918, the vessel was carrying between 30 and 50 depth charges.

== Construction and career ==
Orcadia was laid down by Fairfield at their shipyard in Govan on 24 June 1915 with yard number 518 at a cost of £146,528 to build, launched on 26 July 1916 and completed on 29 September the same year, the first of the name in service with the Royal Navy. The vessel was deployed as part of the Grand Fleet, joining the Fifteenth Destroyer Flotilla. On 22 November, the flotilla took part in exercises north of the Shetland Islands under the dreadnought Iron Duke that also involved the majority of the First and Third Battle Squadrons.

At the start of the following year, Orcadia was detached from the flotilla to serve at Portsmouth naval base. There, the ship joined the Local Defence Flotilla and was allocated to the paravane depot. The paravane was a towed anti-submarine weapon that had been trialled by the Royal Navy on 27 May 1915 and was considered complementary to the depth charge. It was also used for minesweeping. However, the weapon had been increasingly ineffective, as the German submarines were able to dive below its 136 feet (41 m) maximum depth. Despite further work, the weapon increasingly became considered obsolete. Nonetheless, the destroyer remained at the paravane depot into the following year.

After the Armistice of 11 November 1918 that ended the war, the Royal Navy returned to a peacetime level of strength and both the number of ships and the amount of personnel in service needed to be reduced to save money. Orcadia initially remained with the Local Defence Flotilla at Portsmouth. However, this service did not last long. On 31 October 1921, the destroyer was retired and sold to W A T Burden to be broken up at Poole.

== Pennant numbers ==
Pennant number	Date
G53	September 1915
G80	January 1917
D30	January 1918
G39	January 1919
