= HMS Oriole (1916) =

British M-Class destroyer

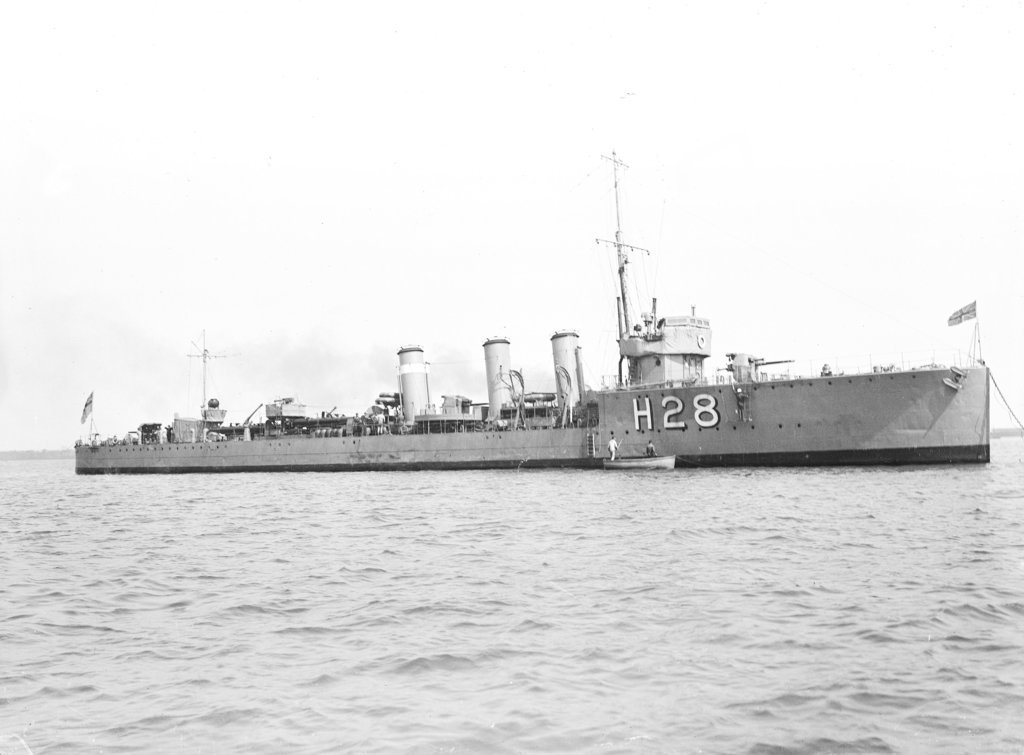
- Sister ship HMS Orpheus in 1918

History

United Kingdom
- Name: HMS Oriole
- Ordered: February 1915
- Builder: Palmers, Jarrow
- Launched: 31 July 1916
- Completed: November 1916
- Out of service: 9 May 1921
- Fate: Sold to be broken up

General characteristics
- Class & type: Admiralty M-class destroyer
- Displacement: 950 long tons (970 t) (normal); 1,021 long tons (1,037 t) (full load)
- Length: 265 ft (81 m) (p.p.)
- Beam: 26 ft 9 in (8 m)
- Draught: 16 ft 3 in (5 m)
- Installed power: 3 Yarrow boilers, 25,000 shp (19,000 kW)
- Propulsion: Parsons steam turbines, 3 shafts
- Speed: 34 knots (63.0 km/h; 39.1 mph)
- Range: 2,530 nmi (4,690 km; 2,910 mi) at 15 kn (28 km/h; 17 mph)
- Complement: 76
- Armament: 3 × single QF 4-inch (102 mm) guns; 1 × single 2-pdr 40 mm (2 in) AA gun; 2 × twin 21 in (533 mm) torpedo tubes

HMS Oriole was a Repeat Admiralty M-class destroyer which served in the Royal Navy during the First World War. The M class were an improvement on the previous L-class, capable of higher speed, armed with three 4-inch (102 mm) guns and four 21 in (533 mm) torpedoes. Launched in 1916, the vessel initially joined the Grand Fleet with the Thirteenth Destroyer Flotilla but, in 1917, was transferred to the Fourth Destroyer Flotilla based at Devonport to provide an escort for convoys travelling from the South. The convoy model, with its escorts, proved increasingly successful at enabling merchant shipping to sail safely, despite changes in tactics by the German submarines. After the Armistice that marked the end of the First World War in 1918, Oriole was placed in reserve, decommissioned and, in 1921, sold to be broken up.

== Design and development ==
Oriole was one of sixteen Repeat Admiralty M-class destroyers ordered by the British Admiralty in February 1915 as part of the Fourth War Construction Programme. The M class was an improved version of the earlier L-class destroyers, required to reach a higher speed in order to counter rumoured German fast destroyers. The remit was to have a maximum speed of 36 knots (67 km/h; 41 mph) and, although the eventual design did not achieve this, the greater performance was appreciated by the navy. It transpired that the German ships did not exist. The Repeat M class differed from the prewar vessels in having a raked stem and design improvements based on wartime experience.

The destroyer was 265 feet (81 m) long between perpendiculars, with a beam of 26 feet 9 inches (8 m) and a draught of 16 feet 3 inches (5 m). Displacement was 950 long tons (970 t) normal and 1,021 long tons (1,037 t) at full load. Power was provided by three Yarrow boilers feeding Parsons steam turbines rated at 25,000 shaft horsepower (19,000 kW) and driving three shafts, to give a design speed of 34 knots (63 km/h; 39 mph). Three funnels were fitted and 296 long tons (301 t) of oil was carried, giving a design range of 2,530 nautical miles (4,690 km; 2,910 mi) at 15 knots (28 km/h; 17 mph). Actual range was less with sister ship Murray stated as having an endurance of 2,230 nautical miles (4,130 km; 2,570 mi).

Armament consisted of three single QF 4-inch (102 mm) Mk IV guns on the ship's centreline, with one on the forecastle, one aft on a raised platform and one between the middle and aft funnels. A single 2-pounder 40 mm (2 in) "pom-pom" anti-aircraft gun was carried, while torpedo armament consisted of two twin mounts for 21 in (533 mm) torpedoes. The ship had a complement of 80 officers and ratings.

== Construction and career ==
Laid down at their shipyard in Jarrow, Oriole was launched by Palmers Shipbuilding and Iron Company on 31 July 1916 and completed during November the same year. The destroyer was the first Royal Navy ship to bear the name. On commissioning, Oriole was initially deployed as part of the Grand Fleet, joining the Thirteenth Destroyer Flotilla based at Rosyth. However, the Admiralty identified a greater need for convoy escorts. During 1917, the warship was transferred to the Fourth Destroyer Flotilla based at Devonport, remaining there until the end of the war. The flotilla provided escorts for convoys sailing from the south. Convoys proved an increasingly effective method to protect merchant shipping, despite changes in tactics by the German submarine commanders.

After the armistice, the Grand Fleet was disbanded and Oriole was placed in reserve with a reduced company at the Nore on 25 March 1919. However, the end of the war meant that the Royal Navy returned to a peacetime level of mobilisation and both the number of ships and the amount of staff needed to be reduced to save money. The harsh conditions of wartime service, exacerbated by the fact that the hull was not galvanised and operations often required high speed in high seas, meant that the destroyer was worn out and ready for retirement. Oriole was decommissioned, and sold to Thos. W. Ward at Rainham, Kent, on 9 May 1921 to be broken up.

== Pennant numbers ==
Pennant number	Date
G44	September 1915
F16	January 1917
D1A	January 1918
D06	March 1918
F86	January 1919
