= HMS Nereus (1916) =

British M-Class destroyer, WW1

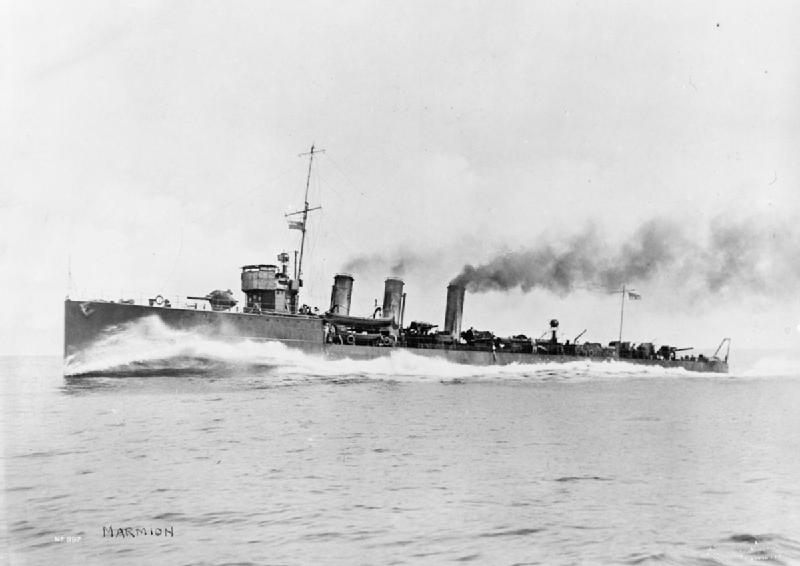
- Sistership Marmion underway at speed

History

United Kingdom
- Name: HMS Nereus
- Namesake: Nereus
- Ordered: September 1914
- Builder: Thornycroft, Woolston, Southampton
- Yard number: 790
- Laid down: March 1915
- Launched: 24 February 1916
- Commissioned: May 1916
- Out of service: 15 November 1921
- Fate: Broken up July 1922

General characteristics
- Class & type: Admiralty M-class destroyer
- Displacement: 994 long tons (1,010 t) (normal); 1,025 long tons (1,041 t) (full load)
- Length: 265 ft (80.8 m) (p.p.)
- Beam: 26 ft 7 in (8.1 m)
- Draught: 8 ft 7 in (2.62 m)
- Installed power: 3 Yarrow boilers, 25,000 shp (19,000 kW)
- Propulsion: Parsons steam turbines, 3 shafts
- Speed: 34 knots (39.1 mph; 63.0 km/h)
- Range: 2,280 nmi (4,220 km; 2,620 mi) at 17 kn (31 km/h; 20 mph)
- Complement: 80
- Armament: 3 × single QF 4-inch (102 mm) Mark IV guns; 1 × single 2-pdr 40 mm (1.6 in) AA gun; 2 × twin 21 in (533 mm) torpedo tubes

HMS Nereus was a Admiralty M-class destroyer which served with the Royal Navy during the First World War. Launched in 1916, the vessel served with the Grand Fleet until the end of the conflict. The vessel operated as part for Thirteenth Destroyer Flotilla in support of convoy operations. In 1918, the flotilla took part in one of the last sorties of the war, although the British and German fleets did not meet and the destroyer returned without seeing any action. After the conflict, the destroyer was worn out by the demands of high speed operation in poor weather. Nereus was decommissioned and sold to be broken up in 1921 after less than six years service.

== Design and development ==
Nereus was one of sixteen Admiralty M-class destroyer destroyers ordered by the British Admiralty in September 1914 as part of the First War Construction Programme. The M-class was an improved version of the earlier L-class destroyers, required to reach a higher speed in order to counter rumoured German fast destroyers. The remit was to have a maximum speed of 36 knots (67 km/h; 41 mph) and, although the eventual design did not achieve this, the greater performance was appreciated by the navy. It transpired that the German ships did not exist.

The destroyer was 265-foot (80.8 m) long between perpendiculars, with a beam of 26 feet 7 inches (8.1 m) and a draught of 8 feet 7 inches (2.6 m). Displacement was 994 long tons (1,010 t) normal and 1,025 long tons (1,041 t) at full load. Power was provided by three oil fired Yarrow boilers each exhausting through three small funnels, which was a distinguishing feature of the class. The boilers fed Parsons steam turbines rated at 25,000 shaft horsepower (19,000 kW) which connected directly to three shafts to give a design speed of 34 knots (63 km/h; 39 mph). A total of 268 long tons (272 t) of oil could be carried, including 40 long tons (41 t) in peace tanks that were not used in wartime, giving a design range of 2,280 nautical miles (4,220 km; 2,620 mi) at 17 knots (31 km/h; 20 mph).

Armament consisted of three single QF 4-inch (102 mm) Mk IV guns on the ship's centreline, with one on the forecastle, one aft on a raised platform and one between the funnels. Torpedo armament consisted of two twin mounts for 21 in (533 mm) torpedoes. A single QF 2-pounder 40 mm (1.6 in) "pom-pom" anti-aircraft gun was mounted between the torpedo tubes. Nereus was equipped with two depth charge chutes aft for anti-submarine warfare. The ship had a complement of 80 officers and ratings.

== Construction and career ==
Construction by John I. Thornycroft & Company of Woolston, Southampton was started when the hull was laid down during March 1915. Yard number 790 was allocated during construction. The ship was launched on 24 February and completed in May the following year. The vessel was named after Nereus, a sea god in Greek mythology.

On entering service, Nereus joined the Grand Fleet as part of the Thirteenth Destroyer Flotilla based at Rosyth. The vessel operated in support of convoy operations. On 13 December, while forming part of a hunting group sent out to search for German warships that threatened convoys in the North Sea, the destroyer's forecastle was damaged by the sea conditions, leading to the entire flotilla being withdrawn. A similar operation took place between 1 and 10 October 1917. The flotilla also took part in the Royal Navy's engagement with one of the final sorties of the German High Seas Fleet during the First World War, on 24 April 1918, although the two fleets did not actually meet and the destroyer saw no action. The destroyer was later transferred to the Fourth Destroyer Flotilla based at Devonport.

The harsh conditions of wartime service, particularly the combination of high speed and the poor weather that is typical of the North Sea, exacerbated by the fact that the hull was not galvanised, meant that the destroyer was soon worn out. After the Armistice of 11 November 1918 that ended the war, the Royal Navy returned to a peacetime level of strength and both the number of ships and personnel needed to be reduced to save money. Nereus was initially moved to Nore and then reduced to Care and Maintenance at Chatham Dockyard on 10 October 1919. Decommissioned and sold to Cashmore of Newport on 15 November 1921, the destroyer was subsequently broken up July the following year. The ship's bell was retained and currently resides in the Imperial War Museum.

== Pennant numbers ==
| Pennant number | Date |
|---|---|
| G19 | September 1915 |
| F12 | January 1917 |
| F33 | January 1918 |
| H21 | April 1918 |
| H37 | November 1918 |
| F80 | January 1919 |
