= HMS Mystic (1915) =

British M-Class destroyer

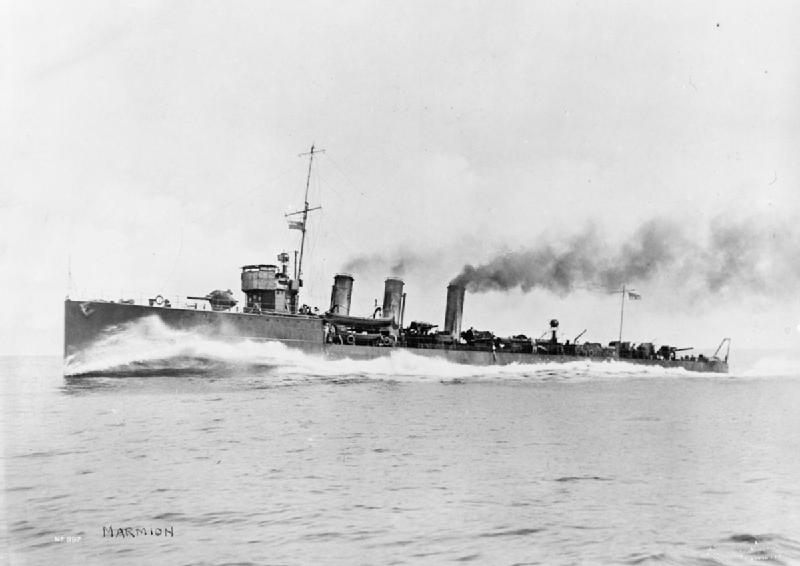
- Sister ship HMS Marmion

History

United Kingdom
- Name: HMS Mystic
- Ordered: September 1914
- Builder: William Denny and Brothers, Dumbarton
- Yard number: 1029
- Laid down: 27 October 1914
- Launched: 20 June 1915
- Completed: 11 November 1915
- Out of service: 8 November 1921
- Fate: Sold to be broken up

General characteristics
- Class & type: Admiralty M-class destroyer
- Displacement: 1,025 long tons (1,041 t) (normal); 1,250 long tons (1,270 t) (full load)
- Length: 265 ft (80.8 m) (o.a.)
- Beam: 26 ft 7 in (8.1 m)
- Draught: 8 ft 7 in (2.6 m)
- Installed power: 3 Yarrow boilers, 25,000 shp (19,000 kW)
- Propulsion: Parsons steam turbines, 3 shafts
- Speed: 34 knots (39.1 mph; 63.0 km/h)
- Range: 2,100 nmi (3,900 km; 2,400 mi) at 15 kn (28 km/h; 17 mph)
- Complement: 80
- Armament: 3 × single QF 4-inch (102 mm) Mark IV guns; 1 × single 2-pdr 40 mm (1.6 in) AA gun; 2 × twin 21 in (533 mm) torpedo tubes; Depth charges

HMS Mystic was an Admiralty M-class destroyer which served with the Royal Navy during the First World War. The M class was an improvement on the previous L class, capable of higher speed. The vessel, originally named HMS Myrtle but renamed before being launched in 1915, joined the Grand Fleet as part of the Eleventh Destroyer Flotilla. The ship was assigned as part of a destroyer screen to protect the British battleships as they sought to destroy the German High Seas Fleet. During the Battle of Jutland in 1916, the destroyer saw action against German light cruisers and, as the evening fell, attacked the German battle line, but recorded no hits. During the following year, the vessel took part in a large anti-submarine patrol, but did not see any German submarines. Later in the war, the ship was transferred to the Coast of Ireland Station at Buncrana and escorted convoys at the start of their journey from ports on the Clyde and Mersey or at the end of their journey across the Atlantic Ocean. After the Armistice in 1918 that marked the end of the First World War, Mystic was placed in reserve before being decommissioned and subsequently sold to be broken up in 1921.

== Design and development ==
Mystic was one of sixteen Admiralty M-class destroyers ordered by the British Admiralty in September 1914 as part of the First War Construction Programme enacted in response to the start of the First World War. The M class was an improved version of the earlier L-class destroyers, required to reach a higher speed in order to counter rumoured German fast destroyers. The remit was to have a maximum speed of 36 knots (67 km/h; 41 mph) and, although the eventual design did not achieve this, the greater performance was appreciated by the Royal Navy. It transpired that the German ships did not exist.

The destroyer was 265 feet (80.8 m) long overall, with a beam of 26 ft 7 in (8.1 m) and a draught of 8 ft 7 in (2.6 m). Displacement was 1,025 long tons (1,041 t) normal and 1,250 long tons (1,270 t) full load. Power was provided by three Yarrow boilers feeding Parsons steam turbines rated at 25,000 shaft horsepower (19,000 kW) and driving three shafts, to give a design speed of 34 kn (63 km/h; 39 mph). Three funnels were fitted. A total of 266 long tons (270 t) of oil could be carried, giving a range of 2,100 nautical miles (3,900 km; 2,400 mi) at 15 knots (28 km/h; 17 mph).

Mystic's armament consisted of three single QF 4-inch (102 mm) Mk IV guns on the ship's centreline, with one on the forecastle, one aft on a raised platform and one between the middle and aft funnels. Torpedo armament consisted of two twin mounts for 21 in (533 mm) torpedoes located aft of the funnels. A single QF 2-pounder 40 mm (1.6 in) "pom-pom" anti-aircraft gun was mounted between the torpedo tubes. After February 1916, for anti-submarine warfare, Mystic was equipped with two chutes and two depth charges. The number of depth charges carried increased as the war progressed. The ship had a complement of 80 officers and ratings.

== Construction and career ==
Laid down by William Denny and Brothers of Dumbarton at their shipyard on 27 October 1914 with the yard number 1029, Mystic was launched on 20 June the following year and completed on 11 November. The vessel was originally to be named Myrtle but was renamed before being launched. The ship was the first of the name Mystic in service with the Royal Navy. The vessel was deployed as part of the Grand Fleet, joining the Eleventh Destroyer Flotilla based at Scapa Flow before the end of the year. On 26 and 27 February 1916, the destroyer took part in a large naval exercise east of Shetland, involving four flotillas of destroyers, as well as all the operational battlecruisers, battleships and cruisers of the Grand Fleet. The exercise was deemed a success. The vessel subsequently took part in a number of sweeps in the North Sea looking for the German High Seas Fleet, including a large operation on 21 April which involved battleships from the 1st, 2nd and 3rd Battle Squadrons. None of these led to a confrontation with the German fleet.

During May, the destroyer sailed to Cromarty along with eight other destroyers from the flotilla and the flotilla leader Kempenfelt to meet with the 2nd Battle Squadron. The ships sailed to rendezvous with the remainder of the Eleventh Destroyer Flotilla under the cruiser Castor on 31 May. The British ships sailed along with the rest of the Grand Fleet to confront the German High Seas fleet in the Battle of Jutland. As the two fleets converged, the flotilla formed close to the battleship King George V, leading at the head of the 2nd Battle Squadron. The destroyer was assigned to be part of a screen to protect the larger ships of the Grand Fleet. As evening fell, Mystic took advantage of a smoke screen laid by the German destroyers to loose a torpedo at the German fleet, but this missed. Two hours later, the flotilla saw a line of unknown vessels ahead, later identified as the light cruisers of the German 2nd Scouting Group. Castor, leading, opened fire, obscuring the ships from the destroyer. Despite being blinded, Mystic launched a second torpedo but this too missed. While Castor and Mystic's sister ship Marne were hit by gunfire during the confrontation, Mystic remained undamaged. Soon after, the destroyer reported a three-funnelled cruiser pass by to port, but no shots were fired. After the end of the battle, the vessel returned to Scapa Flow, arriving on 2 June. On 18 August, the flotilla again sailed with the Grand Fleet under the battleship Iron Duke to seek out the German fleet. The fleets again failed to meet in battle.

The destroyer remained with the Eleventh Destroyer Flotilla into 1917. Although still attached to the Grand Fleet and based at Scapa Flow, the destroyers were often unavailable to the fleet due to work in anti-submarine patrols. For example, between 14 and 24 June, the flotilla was deployed as part of a substantial operation that undertook a wide-reaching search for German submarines around the coast of Scotland. Despite the force employing approximately 56% of the destroyers available to the Grand Fleet, Mystic was not alone in not seeing a single enemy vessel throughout the operation, and no German submarines were sunk. Increasingly, patrols did not provide the security needed to shipping and the Admiralty redeployed the destroyers to act as escorts for convoys, which proved more effective. Mystic was redeployed to the Northern Division of the Coast of Ireland Station at Buncrana in early 1918. The vessel formed part of a group of destroyers that escorted convoys at the final part of their journey across the Atlantic Ocean from the American industrial complex at Hampton Roads and Sydney, Nova Scotia, or after they departed ports on the Clyde and Mersey to cross to North America.

After the Armistice of 11 November and the end of the First World War, the Royal Navy returned to a peacetime level of operational capacity and both the number of ships and personnel needed to be reduced to save money. Mystic was initially placed in reserve at Devonport but on 15 October 1919, the destroyer was passed to care and maintenance. This situation did not last long. The harsh conditions of wartime operations, particularly the combination of high speed and the poor weather that is typical of the North Sea, exacerbated by the fact that the hull was not galvanised, meant that the ship was worn out. Mystic was decommissioned and then, on 8 November 1921, sold to Slough T. C. to be broken up in Germany.

== Pennant numbers ==
Pennant number	Date
H2C	August 1915
G16	January 1917
G3A	March 1918
H42	January 1919
