= HMS Ossory (1915) =

Destroyer of the Royal Navy

History

United Kingdom
- Name: HMS Ossory
- Builder: John Brown & Company, Clydebank
- Laid down: 23 December 1914
- Launched: 9 October 1915
- Completed: November 1915
- Fate: Sold for scrap, 8 November 1921

General characteristics
- Class & type: Admiralty M-class destroyer
- Displacement: 971 long tons (987 t)
- Length: 273 ft 4 in (83.31 m) o/a
- Beam: 26 ft 8 in (8.13 m)
- Draught: 9 ft 8 in (2.95 m)
- Installed power: 25,000 shp (19,000 kW); 4 × Yarrow boilers
- Propulsion: 3 Shafts; 3 steam turbines
- Speed: 34 knots (63 km/h; 39 mph)
- Range: 2,100 nmi (3,900 km; 2,400 mi) at 15 knots (28 km/h; 17 mph)
- Complement: 76
- Armament: 3 × QF 4-inch (102 mm) Mark IV guns; 2 × QF 1.5-pounder (37 mm) or QF 2-pounder (40 mm) "pom-pom" anti-aircraft guns; 2 × twin 21-inch (533 mm) torpedo tubes

HMS Ossory was an Admiralty M-class destroyer built for the Royal Navy during the First World War. She took part in the Battle of Jutland in 1916 and was sold for scrap in 1921.

== Description ==
The Admiralty M class were improved and faster versions of the preceding Laforey-class destroyer. They displaced 971 long tons (987 t). The ships had an overall length of 273 feet 4 inches (83.3 m), a beam of 26 feet 8 inches (8.1 m) and a draught of 9 feet 8 inches (2.9 m). They were powered by three Parsons direct-drive steam turbines, each driving one propeller shaft, using steam provided by four Yarrow boilers. The turbines developed a total of 25,000 shaft horsepower (19,000 kW) and gave a maximum speed of 34 knots (63 km/h; 39 mph). The ships carried a maximum of 237 long tons (241 t) of fuel oil that gave them a range of 2,100 nautical miles (3,900 km; 2,400 mi) at 15 knots (28 km/h; 17 mph). The ships' complement was 76 officers and ratings.

The ships were armed with three single QF 4-inch (102 mm) Mark IV guns and two QF 1.5-pounder (37 mm) anti-aircraft guns. These latter guns were later replaced by a pair of QF 2-pounder (40 mm) "pom-pom" anti-aircraft guns. The ships were also fitted with two above water twin mounts for 21-inch (533 mm) torpedoes.

== Construction and service ==
Ossory was ordered under the Third War Programme in November 1914 and built by John Brown & Company at Clydeside. The ship was laid down on 23 November 1914, launched on 9 October 1915 and completed in November 1915.

After commissioning, Ossosy joined the 11th Destroyer Flotilla of the Grand Fleet. Ossory was refitting in April 1916, but following the outbreak of the Easter Rising against British rule in Ireland on 24 April 1916, was employed in escorting transports carrying two infantry brigades from Liverpool to Ireland to reinforce British forces. She took part in the Battle of Jutland on 31 May – 1 June 1916, still part of the 11th Destroyer Flotilla. On 10 December 1916, Ossory, was one of three destroyers that were attached to the 4th Light Cruiser Squadron, and sent to patrol between Shetland and Norway in an attempt to intercept the German liner Prinz Friedrich Wilhelm, which was about to leave safe harbour in Tromsø to return to Germany. Prinz Friedrich Wilhelm successfully escaped the British ships.

Philip Vian was appointed first lieutenant of the ship in 1917. Ossory was still part of the 11th Flotilla in July 1917, but by September that year had transferred to the 2nd Destroyer Flotilla, based at Buncrana in the North of Ireland. The ship was decommissioned following the First World War and was sold for scrap in November 1921.

== Bibliography ==
- Campbell, John (1998). Jutland: An Analysis of the Fighting. London: Conway Maritime Press. ISBN 0-85177-750-3.
- Colledge, J. J.; Warlow, Ben (2006) [1969]. Ships of the Royal Navy: The Complete Record of All Fighting Ships of the Royal Navy from the 15th Century to the Present (3rd Rev ed.). London: Chatham Publishing. ISBN 978-1-86176-281-8. OCLC 67375475.
- Dittmar, F.J. & Colledge, J.J. (1972). British Warships 1914–1919. Shepperton, UK: Ian Allan. ISBN 0-7110-0380-7.
- Friedman, Norman (2009). British Destroyers: From Earliest Days to the Second World War. Barnsley, UK: Seaforth Publishing. ISBN 978-1-84832-049-9.
- Gardiner, Robert & Gray, Randal (1985). Conway's All The World's Fighting Ships 1906–1921. London: Conway Maritime Press. ISBN 0-85177-245-5.
- March, Edgar J. (1966). British Destroyers: A History of Development, 1892–1953; Drawn by Admiralty Permission From Official Records & Returns, Ships' Covers & Building Plans. London: Seeley Service. OCLC 164893555.
- Monograph No. 31: Home Waters—Part VI: From October 1915 to May 1916 (PDF). Naval Staff Monographs (Historical). Vol. XV. The Naval Staff, Training and Staff Duties Division. 1926.
- Monograph No. 32:Lowestoft Raid (PDF). Naval Staff Monographs (Historical). Vol. XVI. The Naval Staff, Training and Staff Duties Division. 1927.
- Monograph No. 34: Home Waters—Part VIII: December 1916 to April 1917 (PDF). Naval Staff Monographs (Historical). Vol. XVIII. The Naval Staff, Training and Staff Duties Division. 1933.
- Monograph No. 35: Home Waters—Part IX: 1st May, 1917, to 31st July, 1917 (PDF). Naval Staff Monographs (Historical). Vol. XIX. The Naval Staff, Training and Staff Duties Division. 1933.
- Newbolt, Henry (1933). Naval Operations Volume V. History of the Great War. London: Longmans, Green and Co.
