= HMS Nonpareil (1916) =

British M-Class destroyer

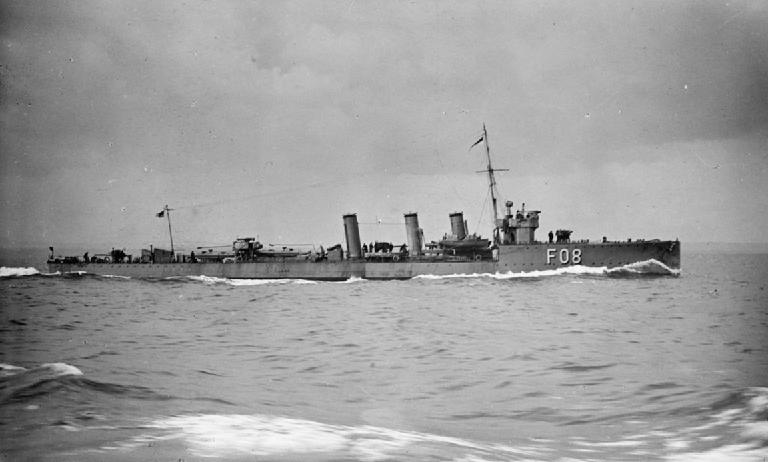
- Sister ship Oracle

History

United Kingdom
- Name: Nonpareil
- Ordered: November 1914
- Builder: Stephens, Linthouse
- Laid down: 24 February 1915
- Launched: 7 February 1916
- Completed: 28 June 1916
- Out of service: 9 May 1921
- Fate: Sold to be broken up

General characteristics
- Class & type: Admiralty M-class destroyer
- Displacement: 948 long tons (963 t) (normal)
- Length: 273 ft 4 in (83.3 m) (o/a); 265 feet (80.8 m) (p.p.)
- Beam: 26 ft 8 in (8.1 m)
- Draught: 8 ft 11 in (2.7 m)
- Installed power: 3 Yarrow boilers, 27,800 shp (20,700 kW)
- Propulsion: Brown-Curtiss steam turbines, 3 shafts
- Speed: 34 knots (63 km/h; 39 mph)
- Range: 2,530 nmi (4,690 km; 2,910 mi) at 15 kn (28 km/h; 17 mph)
- Complement: 80
- Armament: 3 × single QF 4-inch (102 mm) guns; 2 × single 1-pdr 37 mm (1.5 in) AA guns; 2 × twin 21 in (533 mm) torpedo tubes

HMS Nonpareil was a Repeat Admiralty M-class destroyer that served in the Royal Navy during the First World War. The M class was an improvement on those of the preceding L class, capable of higher speed. Nonpareil had a largely uneventful war. Joining the Fourteenth Destroyer Flotilla of the Grand Fleet in 1916, the vessel was soon involved in an exercise that involved most of the dreadnoughts of the First and Third Battle Squadrons but did not take part in any fleet actions. In 1917, the destroyer was a participant in anti-ship and anti-submarine patrols, but these were unsuccessful and the ship did not engage any enemy warships. After the Armistice that ended the war, Nonpareil was initially put in reserve and then sold in 1921 to be broken up.

== Design and development ==
Nonpareil was one of 22 Repeat Admiralty M-class destroyers ordered by the British Admiralty in late November 1914 as part of the Third War Programme soon after the start of the First World War. The M class was an improved version of the earlier L class, required to reach a higher speed in order to counter rumoured new German fast destroyers. The remit was to have a maximum speed of 36 knots (67 km/h; 41 mph) and, although ultimately the destroyers fell short of that ambition in service, the extra performance that was achieved was valued by the navy. It transpired that the German warships did not exist. The Repeat M class differed from the prewar vessels in having a raked stem and design improvements based on wartime experience.

The destroyer had a length of 265 ft (80.8 m) between perpendiculars and 273 ft 4 in (83.3 m) overall, with a beam of 26 ft 8 in (8.1 m) and draught of 8 ft 11 in (2.7 m). Displacement was 948 long tons (963 t) normal. Power was provided by three Yarrow boilers feeding Brown-Curtiss steam turbines rated at 27,800 shaft horsepower (20,700 kW). The turbines drove three shafts and exhausted through three funnels. Design speed was 34 knots (63 km/h; 39 mph), which the vessel exceeded on trials. A total of 228 long tons (232 t) of oil was carried. Design range was 2,530 nautical miles (4,690 km; 2,910 mi) at 15 knots (28 km/h; 17 mph), but actual endurance in service was less; sister ship Murray had a range of 2,240 nautical miles (4,150 km; 2,580 mi) at 15 knots (28 km/h; 17 mph).

Nonpareil had a main armament consisting of three single QF 4-inch (102 mm) Mk IV guns on the centreline, with one on the forecastle, one aft on a raised platform and one between the middle and aft funnels. Torpedo armament consisted of two twin torpedo tubes for 21 in (533 mm) torpedoes located aft of the funnels. Two single 1-pounder 37 mm (1.5 in) "pom-pom" anti-aircraft guns were carried. The anti-aircraft guns were later replaced by 2-pdr 40 mm (1.6 in) "pom-pom" guns. To combat submarines, the destroyer was fitted with racks and storage for depth charges. Initially, only two depth charges were carried but the number increased in service and by 1918, the vessel was carrying between 30 and 50 depth charges. The ship had a complement of 80 officers and ratings.

== Construction and career ==
Nonpareil was laid down by Stephens on 24 February 1915 at Linthouse, launched on 7 February the following year and completed on 28 June. The vessel was the third of the name in service with the Royal Navy and was deployed as part of the Grand Fleet, joining the Fourteenth Destroyer Flotilla based at Scapa Flow. On 4 July, the new flotilla was sent from Scapa Flow to the Humber. On 22 November, the flotilla took part in exercises north of the Shetland Islands under the dreadnought Iron Duke that also involved the majority of the First and Third Battle Squadrons.

During 1917, the Fourteenth Destroyer Flotilla was involved in anti-submarine operations, and for nine days from 15 June the destroyer was stationed off the Shetland Islands. The operation did not lead to the destruction of any submarines and the Admiralty increasingly redeployed the destroyers of the Grand Fleet to escorting convoys. Nonetheless, on 15 October, Nonpareil formed part of a large-scale operation, involving 30 cruisers and 54 destroyers deployed in eight groups across the North Sea in an attempt to stop a suspected sortie by German naval forces. Despite these measures, the German light cruisers Bremse and Brummer managed to attack the regular convoy between Norway and Britain two days later, sinking two destroyers, Mary Rose and Strongbow, and nine merchant ships before returning safely to Germany. The flotilla subsequently took part in a large exercise with other flotillas and fleets of the Grand Fleet, led by the dreadnought battleship Iron Duke, between 22 and 24 November. At the end of the war, Nonsuch was part of the First Destroyer Flotilla based at Portsmouth.

After the Armistice that ended the war in 1918, the Royal Navy returned to a peacetime level of strength and both the number of ships and personnel needed to be reduced to save money. The destroyer was transferred to reserve, remaining in Portsmouth. However, that situation did not last long. The harsh conditions of wartime operations, exacerbated by the fact that the hull was not galvanised, meant that the ship was soon worn out. Nonpareil was retired, and, on 9 May 1921, was sold to Ward to be broken up at Briton Ferry.

== Pennant numbers ==
| Pennant number | Date |
|---|---|
| G37 | September 1915 |
| G53 | January 1917 |
| G54 | January 1918 |
| D0A | September 1918 |
| F71 | January 1919 |
