= HMS Mameluke =

British M-Class destroyer

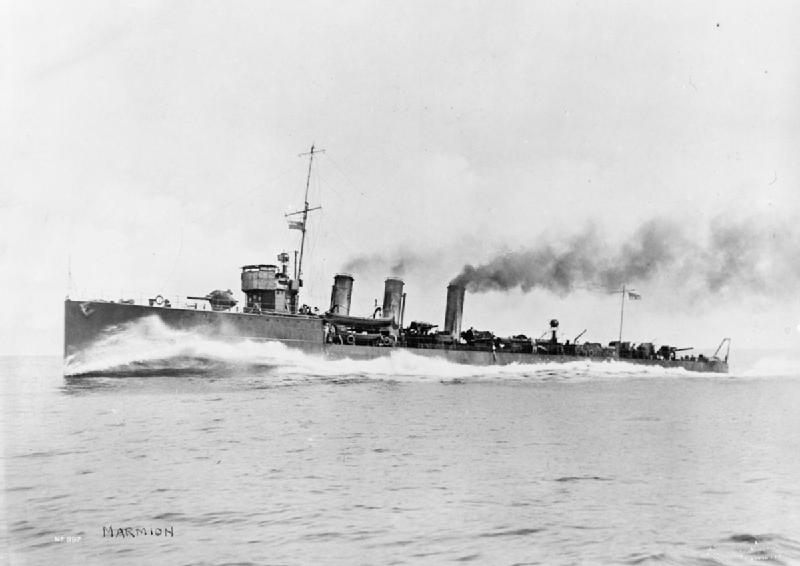
- Sister ship HMS Marmion

History

United Kingdom
- Name: HMS Mameluke
- Namesake: Mameluke
- Ordered: November 1914
- Builder: John Brown & Company, Clydebank
- Yard number: 439
- Laid down: 23 December 1914
- Launched: 14 August 1915
- Completed: 30 October 1915
- Out of service: 22 September 1921
- Fate: Sold to be broken up

General characteristics
- Class & type: Admiralty M-class destroyer
- Displacement: 860 long tons (870 t) (normal); 1,021 long tons (1,037 t) (full load)
- Length: 273 ft 8 in (83.4 m) (o.a.)
- Beam: 26 ft 9 in (8.2 m)
- Draught: 16 ft 3 in (5.0 m)
- Installed power: 3 Yarrow boilers, 25,000 shp (19,000 kW)
- Propulsion: Brown-Curtis steam turbines, 3 shafts
- Speed: 34 knots (63.0 km/h; 39.1 mph)
- Range: 2,280 nmi (4,220 km) at 17 kn (31 km/h)
- Complement: 80
- Armament: 3 × single QF 4-inch (102 mm) Mark IV guns; 1 × single 2-pdr 40 mm (1.6 in) AA gun; 2 × twin 21 in (533 mm) torpedo tubes

HMS Mameluke was an Admiralty M-class destroyer which served with the Royal Navy during the First World War. The M class was an improvement on the preceding L class, capable of higher speeds. The ship, the first Royal Navy vessel to be named after the Mamelukes, a class of ex-slaves that ruled Egypt, was launched in 1915. The destroyer joined the Twelfth Destroyer Flotilla and, although under refit during the Battle of Jutland and so unable to participate, later took part in anti-submarine operations as part of this flotilla, although no submarines were sighted or sunk. The conditions of service in the North Sea meant that the destroyer was soon worn out and, after the armistice, Mameluke was placed in reserve. Despite a service life of only six years, the vessel was decommissioned and, in 1921, sold to be broken up.

== Design and development ==
Mameluke was one of the nine Admiralty M-class destroyers ordered by the British Admiralty in November 1914 as part of the Second Emergency War Programme. The M class was an improved version of the earlier L-class destroyers, required to reach a higher speed in order to counter rumoured German fast destroyers. The remit was to have a maximum speed of 36 knots (67 km/h; 41 mph) and, although the eventual design did not achieve this, the greater performance was appreciated by the navy. It transpired that the German ships did not exist.

The destroyer was 273 feet 8 inches (83.4 m) long overall, with a beam of 26 feet 9 inches (8.2 m) and a draught of 16 feet 3 inches (5.0 m). Displacement was 860 long tons (870 t) normal and 1,021 long tons (1,037 t) full load. Power was provided by three Yarrow boilers feeding Brown-Curtis steam turbines rated at 25,000 shaft horsepower (19,000 kW) that drove three shafts to give a design speed of 34 knots (63 km/h; 39 mph). Three funnels were fitted. A total of 268 long tons (272 t) of oil could be carried, including 40 long tons (41 t) in peace tanks that were not used in wartime, giving a range of 2,280 nautical miles (4,220 km; 2,620 mi) at 17 knots (31 km/h; 20 mph).

Armament consisted of three single QF 4-inch (102 mm) Mk IV guns on the ship's centreline, with one on the forecastle, one aft on a raised platform and one between the middle and aft funnels. Torpedo armament consisted of two twin mounts for 21 in (533 mm) torpedoes. A single QF 2-pounder 40 mm (1.6 in) "pom-pom" anti-aircraft gun was mounted between the torpedo tubes. After February 1916, for anti-submarine warfare, Mameluke was equipped with two chutes for depth charges. The number of depth charges carried increased as the war progressed. The ship had a complement of 80 officers and ratings.

== Construction and career ==
Mameluke was laid down by John Brown & Company of Clydebank on 23 December 1914 with the yard number 439, launched on 14 August the following year and completed on 30 October. The destroyer was the first vessel in the British navy to be named after the Mamelukes, ex-slaves that formed a powerful military force and founded a Sultanate that ruled Egypt. The ship was deployed as part of the Grand Fleet, joining the newly formed Twelfth Destroyer Flotilla.

Mameluke was undergoing refit in May 1916 and so missed the Battle of Jutland. On 24 August, the vessel, as part of the Twelfth Flotilla, unsuccessfully searched for the German submarine UB-27 which had sunk the armed boarding steamer Duke of Albany. The flotilla subsequently took part in a large exercise with other flotillas and fleets of the Grand Fleet, led by the dreadnought battleship Iron Duke, between 22 and 24 November. The destroyer was also involved in anti-submarine patrols between 15 and 22 June the following year. Once again, Mameluke did not see or attack any enemy vessels.

The harsh conditions of wartime operations, particularly the combination of high speed and the poor weather that is typical of the North Sea, exacerbated by the fact that the hull was not galvanised, meant that the destroyer was soon worn out from such service. After the Armistice of 11 November 1918 that ended the war, the Royal Navy returned to a peacetime level of strength and both the number of ships and personnel needed to be reduced to save money. On 15 October 1919, the destroyer was given a reduced complement and placed in reserve at Devonport. However, this did not last long and, after being decommissioned, on 22 September 1921, Mameluke was sold to G Cohen to be broken up in Germany.

== Pennant numbers ==
| Pennant number | Date |
|---|---|
| G11 | September 1915 |
| G27 | January 1917 |
| G26 | January 1918 |
| G02 | September 1918 |
| G22 | January 1919 |
