= HMS Opportune (1915) =

British M-Class destroyer

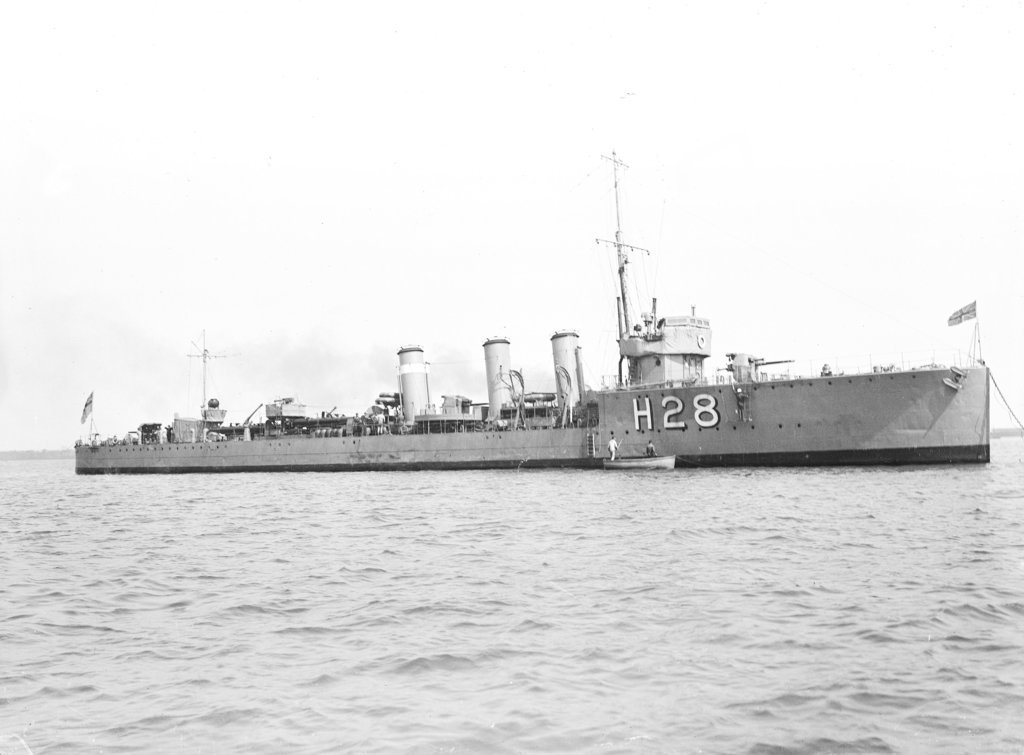
- Sister ship HMS Orpheus in 1918

History

United Kingdom
- Name: HMS Opportune
- Ordered: November 1914
- Builder: Doxford, Sunderland
- Launched: 20 November 1915
- Completed: June 1916
- Out of service: 7 December 1923
- Fate: Sold to be broken up

General characteristics
- Class & type: Admiralty M-class destroyer
- Displacement: 950 long tons (970 t) normal; 1,021 long tons (1,037 t) full load
- Length: 265 ft 8 in (80.98 m) p.p.
- Beam: 26 ft 9 in (8.15 m)
- Draught: 16 ft 3 in (4.95 m)
- Propulsion: 3 Yarrow boilers; 2 Brown-Curtis steam turbines, 25,000 shp (19,000 kW)
- Speed: 34 knots (63.0 km/h; 39.1 mph)
- Range: 3,450 nmi (6,390 km; 3,970 mi) at 15 kn (28 km/h; 17 mph)
- Complement: 76
- Armament: 3 × QF 4 in (102 mm) Mark IV guns (3×1); 1 × 2-pounder (40 mm) "pom-pom" Mk. II anti-aircraft gun (1×1); 4 × 21 in (533 mm) torpedo tubes (2×2)

HMS Opportune was an Admiralty M-class destroyer which served in the Royal Navy during the First World War. The M class were an improvement on the previous L-class, capable of higher speed. The vessel was launched on 20 November 1915 and joined the Grand Fleet. Opportune spent much of the war involved in anti-submarine warfare. The ship took part in large patrols to seek out submarines which involved entire flotillas and also acted as an escort for convoys. After the Armistice that marked the end of the First World War, the destroyer was transferred to Portsmouth and placed in reserve. After a brief spell as a remote controlled target to test how warships responded to attacks by aircraft, Opportune was decommissioned and, on 7 December 1923, sold to be broken up.

== Design and development ==
Opportune was one of twenty-two Admiralty M-class destroyer destroyers ordered by the British Admiralty in November 1914 as part of the Third War Construction Programme. The M-class was an improved version of the earlier L-class destroyer destroyers, originally envisaged to reach the higher speed of 36 knots (67 km/h; 41 mph) in order to counter rumoured German fast destroyers, although the eventual specification was designed for a more economic 34 knots (63 km/h; 39 mph).

The destroyer was 265 feet (80.77 m) long between perpendiculars, with a beam of 26 feet 9 inches (8.15 m) and a draught of 16 feet 3 inches (4.95 m). Displacement was 1,025 long tons (1,041 t) normal and 1,250 long tons (1,270 t) deep load. Power was provided by three Yarrow boilers feeding two Brown-Curtis steam turbines rated at 25,000 shaft horsepower (19,000 kW) and driving two shafts. Three funnels were fitted and 296 long tons (301 t) of oil was carried, giving a design range of 3,450 nautical miles (6,390 km; 3,970 mi) at 15 knots (28 km/h; 17 mph).

Armament consisted of three 4-inch (102 mm) Mk IV QF guns on the ship's centreline, with one on the forecastle, one aft on a raised platform and one between the middle and aft funnels. A single 2-pounder (40 mm) pom-pom anti-aircraft gun was carried, while torpedo armament consisted of two twin mounts for 21 in (533 mm) torpedoes. The ship had a complement of 76 officers and ratings.

== Construction and career ==
Laid down by William Doxford & Sons at their shipyard in Sunderland, Opportune was launched on 20 November 1915 and completed during June the following year The destroyer was the first Royal Navy ship to be given the name. The vessel was deployed as part of the Grand Fleet, joining the Fourteenth Destroyer Flotilla at Scapa Flow.

The destroyer was active in anti-submarine warfare but with variable results. On 15 June 1917, Opportune, along with the rest of the flotilla, was involved in a large sweep of the area west of the Shetland Islands. No submarines were sunk. Increasingly, patrols had not provided the security needed to shipping and the Admiralty redeployed the destroyers of the Grand Fleet to focus on the more effective convoy model. Opportune was one of the vessels detached from the flotilla to act as a convoy escort. The flotilla subsequently took part in the Royal Navy's engagement with one of the final sorties of the German High Seas Fleet during the First World War, on 24 April 1918, although the two fleets did not actually meet and the destroyers returned unharmed.

After the armistice, the Grand Fleet was disbanded. The Royal Navy returned to a peacetime level of mobilisation and both the number of ships and the amount of staff needed to be reduced to save money. Opportune was placed in reserve at Portsmouth and, on 17 October 1919, was placed in care and maintenance. For a brief period, the destroyer was reactivated and used as a remote controlled target to test the resilience of warships against aerial attacks. However, soon after, in 1923, the Navy decided to scrap many of the older destroyers in preparation for the introduction of newer and larger vessels. On 7 December, Opportune was sold to King of Garston to be broken up.

== Pennant numbers ==
Pennant number	Date
G05	September 1915
G58	January 1917
G59	January 1918
G27	January 1919
