= HMS Orford (1916) =

British M-class destroyer

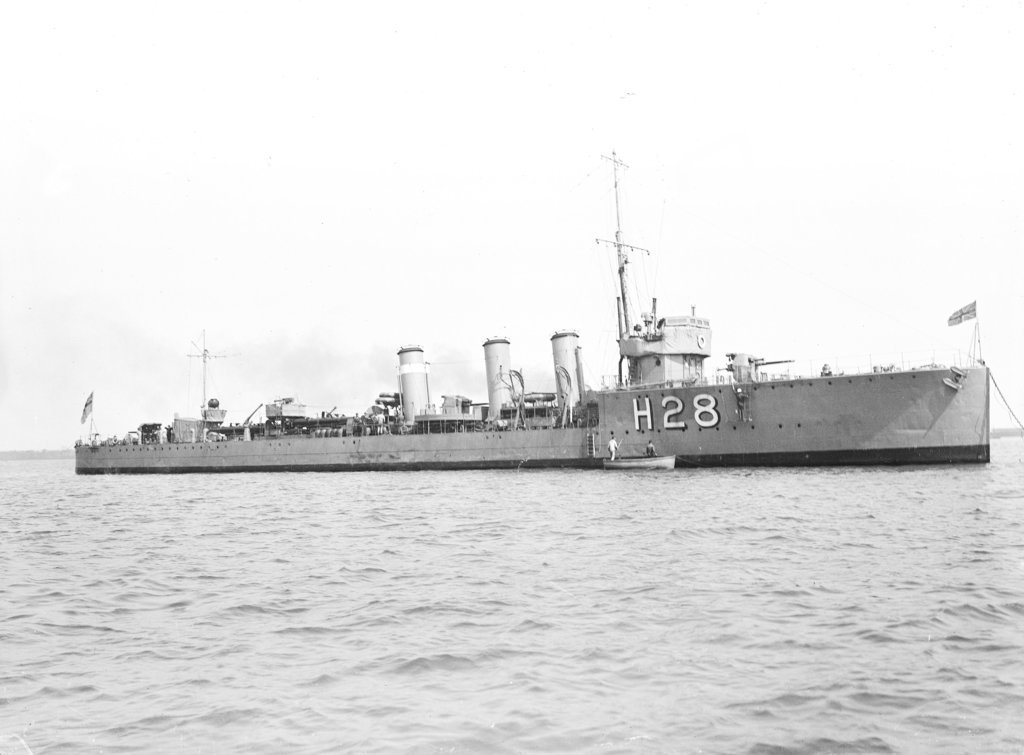
- Sister ship HMS Orpheus in 1918

History

United Kingdom
- Name: HMS Orford
- Namesake: Admiral Russell, 1st Earl of Orford
- Ordered: November 1914
- Builder: Doxford, Sunderland
- Launched: 19 April 1916
- Completed: December 1916
- Out of service: 31 October 1921
- Fate: Sold to be broken up

General characteristics
- Class & type: Admiralty M-class destroyer
- Displacement: 950 long tons (970 t) normal; 1,021 long tons (1,037 t) full load
- Length: 265 ft (80.77 m) p.p.
- Beam: 26 ft 9 in (8.15 m)
- Draught: 16 ft 3 in (4.95 m)
- Propulsion: 3 Yarrow boilers; 2 Brown-Curtis steam turbines, 25,000 shp (19,000 kW)
- Speed: 34 knots (63.0 km/h; 39.1 mph)
- Range: 3,450 nmi (6,390 km; 3,970 mi) at 15 kn (28 km/h; 17 mph)
- Complement: 76
- Armament: 3 × QF 4 in (102 mm) Mark IV guns (3×1); 1 × 2-pounder (40 mm) "pom-pom" Mk. II anti-aircraft gun (1×1); 4 × 21 in (533 mm) torpedo tubes (2×2)

HMS Orford was an Admiralty M-class destroyer which served in the Royal Navy during the First World War. The M class were an improvement on the previous L-class, capable of higher speed. The vessel was launched on 19 April 1916 and joined the Grand Fleet. Orford spent much of the war undertaking anti-submarine warfare patrols and escorting convoys across the Atlantic Ocean. Although based at Scapa Flow, the destroyer ranged far, often operating off the coast of Cornwall and even having a temporary transfer to Buncrana in Ireland in 1917. In 1918, the destroyer took part in one of the final sorties of the Grand Fleet, but saw no action. After the Armistice that marked the end of the First World War, Orford was placed in reserve, decommissioned and, on 31 October 1921, sold to be broken up.

== Design and development ==
Orford was one of twenty-two Admiralty M-class destroyer destroyers ordered by the British Admiralty in November 1914 as part of the Third War Construction Programme. The M-class was an improved version of the earlier L-class destroyer destroyers, originally envisaged to reach the higher speed of 36 knots (67 km/h; 41 mph) in order to counter rumoured German fast destroyers, although the eventual specification was designed for a more economic 34 knots (63 km/h; 39 mph).

The destroyer was 265 feet (80.77 m) long between perpendiculars, with a beam of 26 feet 9 inches (8.15 m) and a draught of 16 feet 3 inches (4.95 m). Displacement was 950 long tons (970 t) normal and 1,021 long tons (1,037 t) deep load. Power was provided by three Yarrow boilers feeding two Brown-Curtis steam turbines rated at 25,000 shaft horsepower (19,000 kW) and driving two shafts. Three funnels were fitted and 296 long tons (301 t) of oil was carried, giving a design range of 3,450 nautical miles (6,390 km; 3,970 mi) at 15 knots (28 km/h; 17 mph).

Armament consisted of three single 4-inch (102 mm) Mk IV QF guns on the ship's centreline, with one on the forecastle, one aft on a raised platform and one between the middle and aft funnels. A single 2-pounder (40 mm) pom-pom anti-aircraft gun was carried, while torpedo armament consisted of two twin mounts for 21 in (533 mm) torpedoes. The ship had a complement of 76 officers and ratings.

== Construction and career ==
Laid down at their shipyard in Sunderland, Orford was launched by William Doxford & Sons on 19 April 1916 and completed during December that year. The destroyer was the seventh Royal Navy ship to have the name. The ship recalled Admiral Edward Russell, 1st Earl of Orford, who fought at the Battles of Barfleur and La Hougue. The vessel was deployed as part of the Grand Fleet, joining the Fourteenth Destroyer Flotilla at Scapa Flow.

The destroyer was active in anti-submarine warfare, both independently and as part of an escort for convoys. The destroyer often patrolled as far as the coast of Cornwall. On 1 February 1917, Orford spotted the German submarine U-55, which had just attacked the Norwegian freighter SS Ramsholm]. Before the submarine could sink the already evacuated ship, Orford opened fire and drove the submarine under the surface. The destroyer then dropped a pattern of four depth charges, but the submarine escaped. On 6 March, Orford formed part of the escort for convoys sailing between the UK and France. Sometimes escorting and patrolling duties were combined. For example, on 9 July 1917, the destroyer, along with the Acacia-class sloop Primrose, escorted two oil tankers from Buncrana in Ireland to a position in the Atlantic Ocean, where they then split off to undertake a patrol of the area. By this point, Orford had been detached from the Flotilla and was serving with the Southern Division of the Coast of Ireland Station. The destroyer rejoined the flotilla, however, soon afterwards. On 17 October, the destroyer formed part of the shield for the 4th Light Cruiser Squadron during the Action off Lerwick, but took no active part in the action. Orford subsequently took part in the Royal Navy's engagement with one of the final sorties of the German High Seas Fleet during the First World War, on 24 April 1918, although the two fleets did not actually meet and the destroyer returned unharmed.

After the armistice, the Grand Fleet was disbanded and Orford was placed in reserve at the Nore on 17 October 1919. However, the harsh conditions of wartime service, exacerbated by the fact that the hull was not galvanised and operations often required high speed in high seas, meant that the destroyer was worn out and ready for retirement. Orford was decommissioned, sold to W & A.T. Burden on 31 October 1921 to be broken up.

== Pennant numbers ==
Pennant number	Date
G38	September 1915
G59	January 1917
G61	January 1918
D70	November 1918
H76	January 1919
