= HMS Osiris (1916) =

British M-Class destroyer

HMS Osiris was an Admiralty M-class destroyer which served in the Royal Navy during the First World War. The M class was an improvement on those of the preceding L class, capable of higher speed. Launched in 1916, the vessel was sold to be broken up in 1921.
