= HMS Minion =

British M-Class destroyer

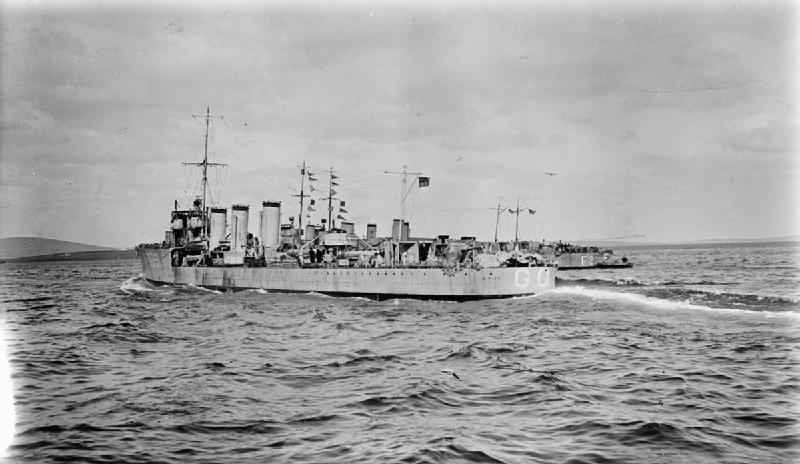
- Minion

History

United Kingdom
- Name: HMS Minion
- Namesake: Minion
- Ordered: September 1914
- Builder: Thornycroft, Woolston, Southampton
- Laid down: November 1914
- Launched: 11 September 1915
- Completed: November 1915
- Out of service: 8 November 1921
- Fate: Sold to be broken up

General characteristics
- Class & type: Admiralty M-class destroyer
- Displacement: 971 long tons (987 t) (normal)
- Length: 273 ft 4 in (83.3 m) (o/a); 265 feet (80.8 m) (p.p.)
- Beam: 26 ft 8 in (8.1 m)
- Draught: 8 ft 11 in (2.7 m)
- Installed power: 3 Yarrow boilers, 25,000 shp (19,000 kW)
- Propulsion: Parsons steam turbines, 3 shafts
- Speed: 34 knots (63 km/h; 39 mph)
- Range: 2,530 nmi (4,690 km; 2,910 mi) at 15 kn (28 km/h; 17 mph)
- Complement: 80
- Armament: 3 × single QF 4-inch (102 mm) guns; 2 × single 1-pdr 37 mm (1.5 in) AA guns; 2 × twin 21 in (533 mm) torpedo tubes

HMS Minion was an Admiralty M-class destroyer which served in the Royal Navy during the First World War. The M-class ships were an improvement on those of the preceding L class, capable of higher speed. Minion was launched in 1915 and joined the Grand Fleet. The destroyer participated in the Battle of Jutland in 1916 as part of the Eleventh Destroyer Flotilla, particularly in the evening action between the light cruisers. During an anti-submarine patrol during the following year, the destroyer ran low on fuel. An attempt was made to refuel from the light cruiser Calliope, which was unsuccessful, leading to the patrol being curtailed. In 1918, the vessel was transferred to Devonport as part of the Fourth Destroyer Flotilla. After the Armistice, Minion was sold to be broken up in 1921.

== Design and development ==
Minion was one of the sixteen Admiralty M-class destroyers ordered by the British Admiralty in September 1914 as part of the First War Programme. The M class was an improved version of the earlier L class, required to reach a higher speed in order to counter rumoured new German fast destroyers. The remit was to have a maximum speed of 36 knots (67 km/h; 41 mph) and, although ultimately the destroyers fell short of that ambition in service, the extra performance that was achieved was valued by the navy. It transpired that the German warships did not exist.

The destroyer had a length of 265 ft (80.8 m) between perpendiculars and 273 ft 4 in (83.3 m) overall, with a beam of 26 ft 8 in (8.1 m) and draught of 8 ft 11 in (2.7 m). Displacement was 971 long tons (987 t) normal. Power was provided by three Yarrow boilers feeding Brown-Curtiss rated at 23,000 shaft horsepower (17,000 kW), driving three shafts and exhausting through three funnels. Design speed was 34 knots (63 km/h; 39 mph), although Minion managed 33.88 knots (62.75 km/h; 38.99 mph) on 22,500 shp (16,800 kW) during trials. A total of 228 long tons (232 t) of oil was carried. Design range was 2,530 nautical miles (4,690 km; 2,910 mi) at 15 knots (28 km/h; 17 mph), but actual endurance in service was less; sister ship Murray had a range of 2,240 nautical miles (4,150 km; 2,580 mi) at 15 knots (28 km/h; 17 mph).

Minion had a main armament consisting of three single QF 4-inch (102 mm) Mk IV guns on the centreline, with one on the forecastle, one aft on a raised platform and one between the middle and aft funnels. Torpedo armament consisted of two twin torpedo tubes for 21 in (533 mm) located aft of the funnels. Two single 1-pounder 37 mm (1.5 in) "pom-pom" anti-aircraft guns were carried. The anti-aircraft guns were later replaced by 2-pdr 40 mm (1.6 in) "pom-pom" guns. The ship had a complement of 80 officers and ratings.

== Construction and career ==
Minion was laid down by John I. Thornycroft & Company at their yard in Woolston, Southampton in November 1914, was launched on 11 September the following year and was completed three months later in the following November. The vessel was the fourth to be named after the minion, a small cannon. Minion was deployed as part of the Grand Fleet, joining the Eleventh Destroyer Flotilla.

On 26 and 27 February 1916, the flotilla took part in a large naval exercise east of Shetland, involving four flotillas of destroyers, as well as all the operational battlecruisers, battleships and cruisers of the Grand Fleet. On 17 March, the flotilla was unsuccessful in destroying the German U-boat U-48 that had been operating off the Straits of Dover. It was then split into two halves to support the Navy's light cruisers. During May, the destroyer sailed to Cromarty along with eight other destroyers from the flotilla and the flotilla leader Kempenfelt to meet with the 2nd Battle Squadron. The ships sailed to rendezvous with the remainder of the Eleventh Destroyer Flotilla under the light cruiser Castor on 31 May. The British ships sailed along with the rest of the Grand Fleet to confront the German High Seas fleet in the Battle of Jutland. As the two fleets converged, the flotilla formed close to the dreadnought battleship King George V, leading at the head of the Second Battle Squadron. As evening fell, the flotilla saw a line of unknown vessels ahead, later identified as the light cruisers of the German 2nd Scouting Group. Minion took no active part in the ensuing skirmish.

The destroyer, along with the rest of the flotilla, returned to Scapa Flow on 2 June. The destroyer remained part of the Eleventh Destroyer Flotilla on 19 August, based at Scapa Flow. On 30 April 1917, Minion, along with the light cruisers Calliope and Comus, was on an anti-submarine patrol when the destroyer ran low on fuel. An unsuccessful attempt was made to refuel from Calliope. This led to the deployment being curtailed. On 16 October, the ship formed part of a fleet of 84 ships, including 54 destroyers, that were sent to protect convoys travelling from Scandinavia. The deployment led to two British destroyers being sunk by German cruisers while Minion did not even sight the enemy. At the beginning of the following year, the destroyer was transferred to the Fourth Destroyer Flotilla to act as local defence for the naval base at Devonport.

After the Armistice of 11 November 1918 that ended the war, the Royal Navy returned to a peacetime level of strength and both the number of ships and personnel needed to be reduced to save money. Minion continued to be operated as part of the defence flotilla at Devonport into 1919. However, the harsh conditions of wartime operations, particularly the combination of high speed and the poor weather that is typical of the North Sea, exacerbated by the fact that the hull was not galvanised, meant that the ship was soon worn out. The destroyer was declared superfluous to operational requirements, retired, and, on 8 November 1921, was sold to Slough Trading Company. Minion was sent to Germany to be broken up.

== Pennant numbers ==
Pennant number	Date
HC7	August 1915
G09	January 1918
G14	March 1918
H82	June 1918
F90	January 1919
