= HMS Offa (1916) =

British M-Class destroyer

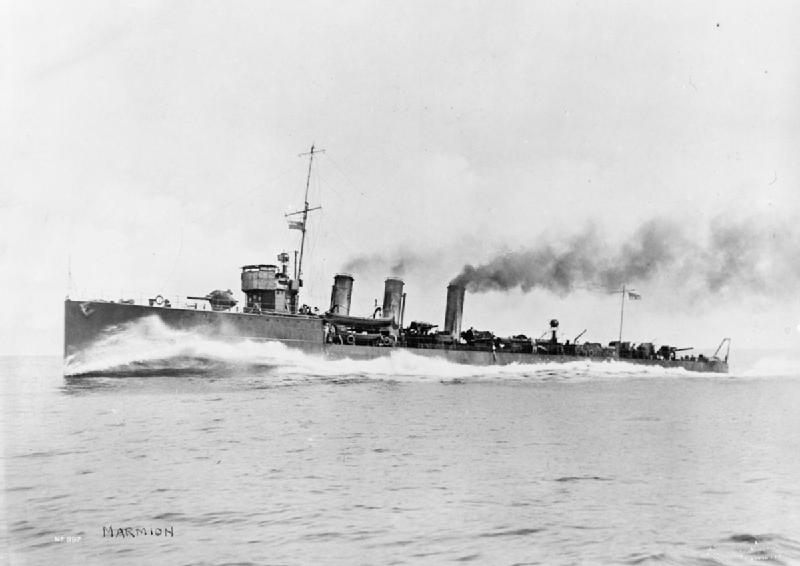
- Sister ship Marmion

History

United Kingdom
- Name: Offa
- Ordered: February 1915
- Builder: Fairfield, Govan
- Laid down: 6 July 1915
- Launched: 7 June 1916
- Completed: 31 July 1916
- Out of service: 30 October 1921
- Fate: Sold to be broken up

General characteristics
- Class & type: Admiralty M-class destroyer
- Displacement: 948 long tons (963 t) (normal)
- Length: 273 ft 4 in (83.3 m) (o/a); 265 feet (80.8 m) (p.p.)
- Beam: 26 ft 8 in (8.1 m)
- Draught: 8 ft 11 in (2.7 m)
- Installed power: 3 Yarrow boilers, 27,800 shp (20,700 kW)
- Propulsion: Brown-Curtiss steam turbines, 3 shafts
- Speed: 34 knots (63 km/h; 39 mph)
- Range: 2,530 nmi (4,690 km; 2,910 mi) at 15 kn (28 km/h; 17 mph)
- Complement: 80
- Armament: 3 × single QF 4-inch (102 mm) guns; 2 × single 1-pdr 37 mm (1.5 in) AA guns; 2 × twin 21 in (533 mm) torpedo tubes

HMS Offa was a Repeat Admiralty M-class destroyer that served in the Royal Navy during the First World War. The M class was an improvement on those of the preceding L class, capable of higher speed. A member of the Fourteenth Destroyer Flotilla of the Grand Fleet from 1916, Offa had a largely uneventful war. Soon after joining the flotilla, the vessel participated in an exercise that involved most of the dreadnoughts of the First and Third Battle Squadrons but did not take part in any fleet actions with Germany. In 1917, the destroyer was a participant in anti-ship and anti-submarine patrols, but, once again, the ship did not engage any enemy warships. After the Armistice that ended the war, Offa was initially put in reserve and then sold in 1921 to be broken up.

== Design and development ==
Offa was one of 16 Repeat Admiralty M-class destroyers ordered by the British Admiralty in February 1915 as part of the Fourth War Programme soon after the start of the First World War. The M class was an improved version of the earlier L class, required to reach a higher speed in order to counter rumoured new German fast destroyers. The remit was to have a maximum speed of 36 knots (67 km/h; 41 mph) and, although ultimately the destroyers fell short of that ambition in service, the extra performance that was achieved was valued by the navy. It transpired that the German warships did not exist. The Repeat M class differed from the prewar vessels in having a raked stem and minor design improvements based on wartime experience.

The destroyer had a length of 265 ft (80.8 m) between perpendiculars and 273 ft 4 in (83.3 m) overall, with a beam of 26 ft 8 in (8.1 m) and draught of 8 ft 11 in (2.7 m). Displacement was 948 long tons (963 t) normal. Power was provided by three Yarrow boilers feeding Brown-Curtiss steam turbines rated at 27,800 shaft horsepower (20,700 kW). The turbines drove three shafts and exhausted through three funnels. Design speed was 34 knots (63 km/h; 39 mph), which the vessel exceeded on trials. A total of 228 long tons (232 t) of oil was carried to give a design range of 2,530 nautical miles (4,690 km; 2,910 mi) at 15 knots (28 km/h; 17 mph). The ship had a complement of 80 officers and ratings.

Offa had a main armament consisting of three single QF 4-inch (102 mm) Mk IV guns on the centreline, with one on the forecastle, one aft on a raised platform and one between the middle and aft funnels. Torpedo armament consisted of two twin torpedo tubes for 21 in (533 mm) torpedoes located aft of the funnels. Two single 1-pounder 37 mm (1.5 in) "pom-pom" anti-aircraft guns were carried. The anti-aircraft guns were later replaced by 2-pdr 40 mm (1.6 in) "pom-pom" guns and the destroyer was also fitted with racks and storage for depth charges. Initially, only two depth charges were carried but the number increased in service and by 1918, the vessel was carrying between 30 and 50 depth charges.

== Construction and career ==
Offa was laid down by Fairfield at their shipyard in Govan on 6 July 1915, launched on 7 June 1916 and completed on 31 July the same year, the second of the name in service with the Royal Navy. The vessel was deployed as part of the Grand Fleet, joining the Fourteenth Destroyer Flotilla. On 4 July, the new flotilla was sent from Scapa Flow to the Humber. On 22 November, the flotilla took part in exercises north of the Shetland Islands under the dreadnought Iron Duke that also involved the majority of the First and Third Battle Squadrons.

During 1917, the Fourteenth Destroyer Flotilla was involved in anti-submarine operations, and for nine days from 31 July the destroyer was stationed off the Shetland Islands. The operation did not lead to the destruction of any submarines and the Admiralty increasingly redeployed the destroyers of the Grand Fleet to escorting convoys. Nonetheless, on 15 October, Offa formed part of a large-scale operation, involving 30 cruisers and 54 destroyers deployed in eight groups across the North Sea in an attempt to stop a suspected sortie by German naval forces. Despite these measures, the German light cruisers Bremse and Brummer managed to attack the regular convoy between Norway and Britain two days later, sinking two destroyers, Mary Rose and Strongbow, and nine merchant ships before returning safely to Germany.

After the Armistice of 11 November 1918 that ended the war, the Royal Navy returned to a peacetime level of strength and both the number of ships and the amount of personnel in service needed to be reduced to save money. Offa initially joined the Local Defence Flotilla at Portsmouth but was placed in Care and Maintenance at Plymouth alongside 50 other destroyers. The destroyer was retired, and, on 30 October 1921, was sold to W A T Burden to be broken up at Milford Haven.

== Pennant numbers ==
Pennant number	Date
G41	September 1915
G55	January 1917
G51	January 1918
G56	January 1918
D79	November 1918
F72	January 1919
