= HMS Oberon (1916) =

British M-Class destroyer

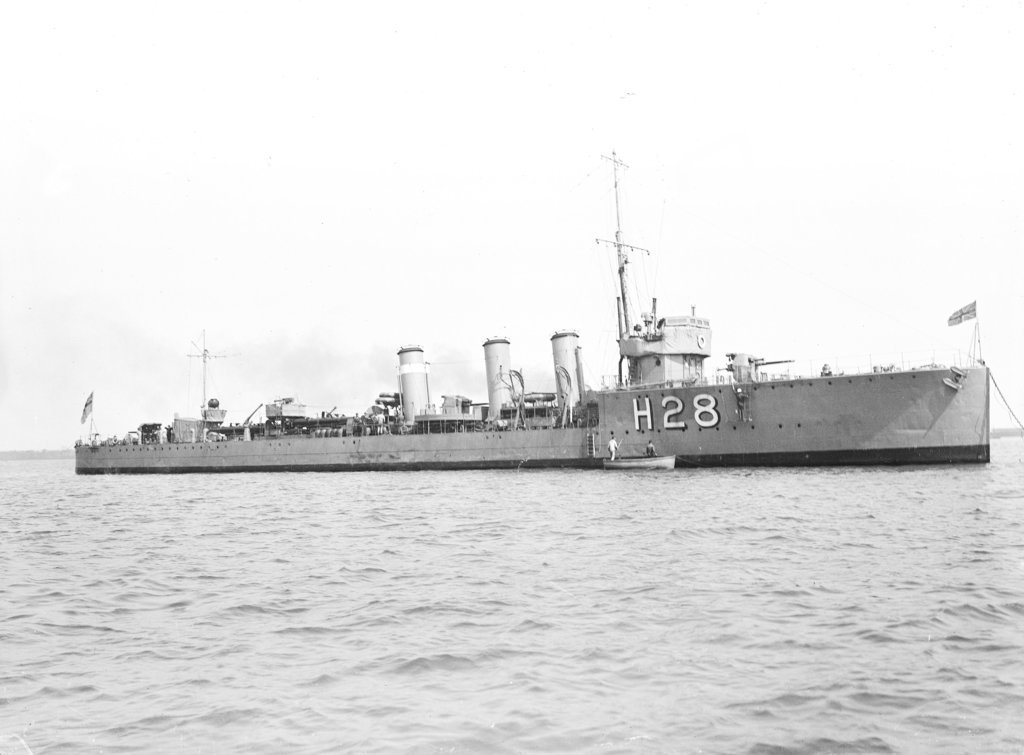
- Sister ship HMS Orpheus in 1918

History

United Kingdom
- Name: HMS Oberon
- Ordered: February 1915
- Builder: Doxford, Sunderland
- Launched: 29 September 1916
- Completed: December 1916
- Out of service: 9 May 1921
- Fate: Sold to be broken up

General characteristics
- Class & type: Admiralty M-class destroyer
- Displacement: 950 long tons (970 t) (normal); 1,021 long tons (1,037 t) (full load)
- Length: 265 ft (81 m) (p.p.)
- Beam: 26 ft 9 in (8 m)
- Draught: 16 ft 3 in (5 m)
- Installed power: 3 Yarrow boilers, 25,000 shp (19,000 kW)
- Propulsion: Brown-Curtis steam turbines, 3 shafts
- Speed: 34 knots (63.0 km/h; 39.1 mph)
- Range: 3,450 nmi (6,390 km; 3,970 mi) at 15 kn (28 km/h; 17 mph)
- Complement: 76
- Armament: 3 × single QF 4-inch (102 mm) Mark IV guns; 1 × single 2-pdr 40 mm (2 in) AA gun; 2 × twin 21 in (533 mm) torpedo tubes

HMS Oberon was a Repeat Admiralty M-class destroyer which served in the Royal Navy during the First World War. The M class were an improvement on the previous L-class, capable of higher speed. The vessel was launched in 1916 and joined the Grand Fleet. Oberon joined the Thirteenth Destroyer Flotilla which, in 1917, participated in a large anti-submarine warfare operation in the North Sea. The sortie led to three German submarines being sunk, although Oberon was not directly involved in these attacks. In 1918, the flotilla was involved in one of the final sorties of the Grand Fleet, but again the destroyer saw no action at the time. After the Armistice that marked the end of the First World War, Oberon was placed in reserve, decommissioned and, in 1921, sold to be broken up.

== Design and development ==
Oberon was one of sixteen Repeat Admiralty M-class destroyer destroyers ordered by the British Admiralty in February 1915 as part of the Fourth War Construction Programme. The M-class was an improved version of the earlier L-class destroyers, required to reach a higher speed in order to counter rumoured German fast destroyers. The remit was to have a maximum speed of 36 knots (67 km/h; 41 mph) and, although the eventual design did not achieve this, the greater performance was appreciated by the navy. It transpired that the German ships did not exist. The Repeat M class differed from the prewar vessels in having a raked stem and design improvements based on wartime experience.

The destroyer was 265 feet (81 m) long between perpendiculars, with a beam of 26 feet 9 inches (8 m) and a draught of 16 feet 3 inches (5 m). Displacement was 950 long tons (970 t) normal and 1,021 long tons (1,037 t) at full load. Power was provided by three Yarrow boilers feeding Brown-Curtis steam turbines rated at 25,000 shaft horsepower (19,000 kW) and driving three shafts, to give a design speed of 34 knots (63 km/h; 39 mph). Three funnels were fitted and 296 long tons (301 t) of oil was carried, giving a design range of 3,450 nautical miles (6,390 km; 3,970 mi) at 15 knots (28 km/h; 17 mph).

Armament consisted of three single QF 4-inch (102 mm) Mk IV guns on the ship's centreline, with one on the forecastle, one aft on a raised platform and one between the middle and aft funnels. A single 2-pounder 40 mm (2 in) "pom-pom" anti-aircraft gun was carried, while torpedo armament consisted of two twin mounts for 21 in (533 mm) torpedoes. The ship had a complement of 80 officers and ratings.

== Construction and career ==
Laid down at their shipyard in Sunderland, Oberon was launched by William Doxford & Sons on 29 September 1916 and completed during December the same year. The destroyer was the fourth Royal Navy ship to bear the name. On commissioning, Oberon was deployed as part of the Grand Fleet, joining the Thirteenth Destroyer Flotilla based at Rosyth. Between 1 and 10 October 1917, the flotilla took part in a large exercise to detect and trap German submarines in the North Sea. Although Oberon was not directly involved, three enemy boats were sunk in the operation. The flotilla took part in the Royal Navy's engagement with one of the final sorties of the German High Seas Fleet during the First World War, on 24 April 1918, although the two fleets did not actually meet and the destroyer saw no action.

After the armistice, the Grand Fleet was disbanded and Oberon was placed in reserve with a reduced company at the Nore on 28 November 1919. The harsh conditions of wartime service, exacerbated by the fact that the hull was not galvanised and operations often required high speed in high seas, meant that the destroyer was worn out and ready for retirement. Oberon was decommissioned, and sold to Thos. W. Ward at Rainham, Kent, on 9 May 1921 to be broken up.

== Pennant numbers ==
Pennant number	Date
G80	September 1915
F27	January 1917
F36	January 1918
H35	March 1918
F84	January 1919
