= HMS Octavia (1916) =

British M-Class destroyer

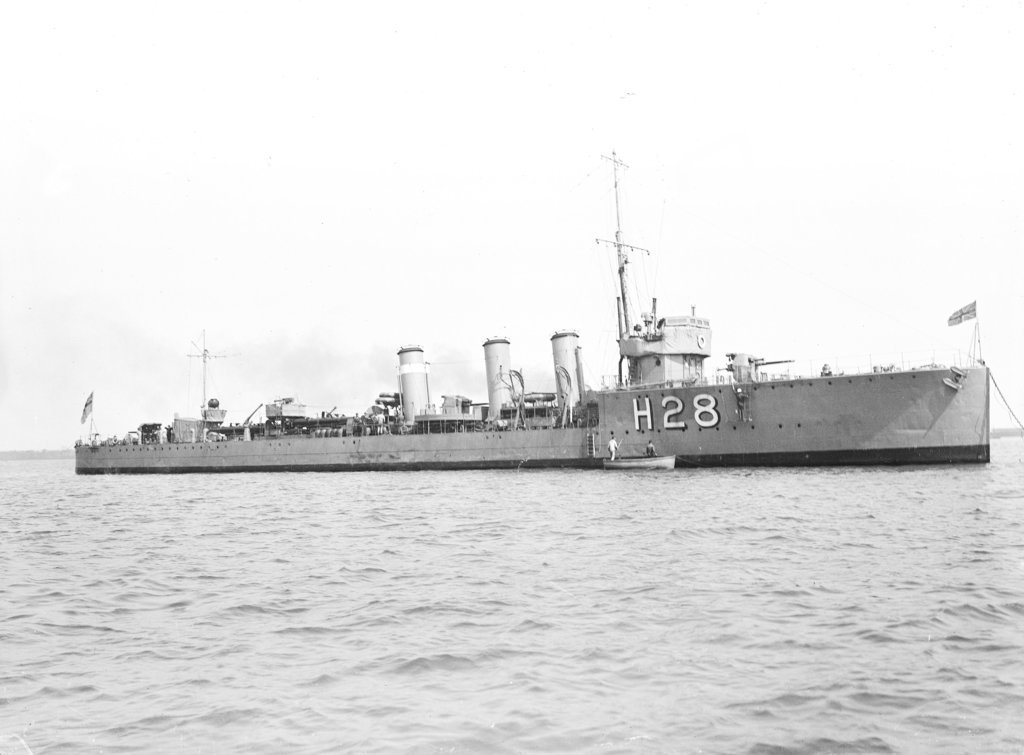
- Sister ship HMS Orpheus in 1918

History

United Kingdom
- Name: HMS Octavia
- Ordered: November 1914
- Builder: Doxford, Sunderland
- Launched: 21 June 1916
- Completed: November 1916
- Out of service: 5 November 1921
- Fate: Sold to be broken up

General characteristics
- Class & type: Admiralty M-class destroyer
- Displacement: 950 long tons (970 t) normal; 1,021 long tons (1,037 t) full load
- Length: 265 ft (80.77 m) p.p.
- Beam: 26 ft 9 in (8.15 m)
- Draught: 16 ft 3 in (4.95 m)
- Propulsion: 3 Yarrow boilers; 2 Brown-Curtis steam turbines, 25,000 shp (19,000 kW)
- Speed: 34 knots (63.0 km/h; 39.1 mph)
- Range: 3,450 nmi (6,390 km; 3,970 mi) at 15 kn (28 km/h; 17 mph)
- Complement: 76
- Armament: 3 × QF 4 in (102 mm) Mark IV guns (3×1); 1 × 2-pounder (40 mm) "pom-pom" Mk. II anti-aircraft gun (1×1); 4 × 21 in (533 mm) torpedo tubes (2×2)

HMS Octavia was an Admiralty M-class destroyer which served in the Royal Navy during the First World War. The M class were an improvement on the previous L-class, capable of higher speed. The vessel was launched on 21 June 1916 and joined the Grand Fleet. Octavia joined the Thirteenth Destroyer Flotilla, which, in 1917, participated in a large anti-submarine warfare operation in the North Sea. The sortie led to three German submarines being sunk, although Octavia was not directly involved in these attacks. In 1918, the flotilla was involved in one of the final sorties of the Grand Fleet, but again the destroyer saw no action at the time. After the Armistice that marked the end of the First World War, Octavia was placed in reserve, decommissioned and, on 5 November 1921, sold to be broken up.

== Design and development ==
Octavia was one of twenty-two Admiralty M-class destroyer destroyers ordered by the British Admiralty in November 1914 as part of the Third War Construction Programme. The M-class was an improved version of the earlier L-class destroyer destroyers, originally envisaged to reach the higher speed of 36 knots (67 km/h; 41 mph) in order to counter rumoured German fast destroyers, although the eventual specification was designed for a more economic 34 knots (63 km/h; 39 mph).

The destroyer was 265 feet (80.77 m) long between perpendiculars, with a beam of 26 feet 9 inches (8.15 m) and a draught of 16 feet 3 inches (4.95 m). Displacement was 950 long tons (970 t) normal and 1,021 long tons (1,037 t) deep load. Power was provided by three Yarrow boilers feeding two Brown-Curtis steam turbines rated at 25,000 shaft horsepower (19,000 kW) and driving two shafts. Three funnels were fitted and 296 long tons (301 t) of oil was carried, giving a design range of 3,450 nautical miles (6,390 km; 3,970 mi) at 15 knots (28 km/h; 17 mph).

Armament consisted of three single 4-inch (102 mm) Mk IV QF guns on the ship's centreline, with one on the forecastle, one aft on a raised platform and one between the middle and aft funnels. A single 2-pounder (40 mm) pom-pom anti-aircraft gun was carried, while torpedo armament consisted of two twin mounts for 21 in (533 mm) torpedoes. The ship had a complement of 76 officers and ratings.

== Construction and career ==
Laid down at their shipyard in Sunderland, Octavia was launched by William Doxford & Sons on 21 June 1916 and completed during November. Originally to be named Oryx, the vessel was renamed in 1915 before being laid down. The destroyer was the second Royal Navy ship to have the name. Octavia was deployed as part of the Grand Fleet, joining the Thirteenth Destroyer Flotilla at Rosyth. Between 1 and 10 October 1917, the flotilla was involved in a large exercise to detect and trap German submarines in the North Sea. Although Octavia was not directly involved, three enemy boats were sunk in the operation. The flotilla took part in the Royal Navy's engagement with one of the final sorties of the German High Seas Fleet during the First World War, on 24 April 1918, although the two fleets did not actually meet and the destroyer saw no action.

After the armistice, the Grand Fleet was disbanded and Octavia was placed in reserve at the Nore on 14 November 1919. The harsh conditions of wartime service, exacerbated by the fact that the hull was not galvanised and operations often required high speed in high seas, meant that the destroyer was worn out and ready for retirement. Octavia was decommissioned, sold to Granton on 5 November 1921 to be broken up.

== Pennant numbers ==
Pennant number	Date
G51	September 1915
F07	January 1917
F09	January 1918
G71	March 1918
G28	January 1919
