= HMS Oracle (1915) =

British M-Class destroyer

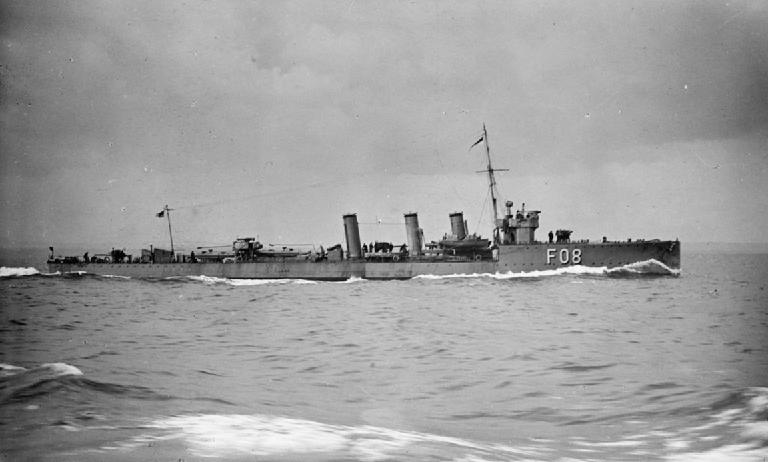
- Oracle

History

United Kingdom
- Name: HMS Oracle
- Namesake: Oracle
- Ordered: November 1914
- Builder: Doxford, Sunderland
- Launched: 23 December 1915
- Completed: August 1916
- Out of service: 30 October 1921
- Fate: Sold to be broken up

General characteristics
- Class & type: Admiralty M-class destroyer
- Displacement: 950 long tons (970 t) normal; 1,021 long tons (1,037 t) full load
- Length: 265 ft 8 in (80.98 m) p.p.
- Beam: 26 ft 9 in (8.15 m)
- Draught: 16 ft 3 in (4.95 m)
- Propulsion: 3 Yarrow boilers; 2 Brown-Curtis steam turbines, 25,000 shp (19,000 kW)
- Speed: 34 knots (63.0 km/h; 39.1 mph)
- Range: 2,280 nmi (4,220 km; 2,620 mi) at 15 kn (28 km/h; 17 mph)
- Complement: 80
- Armament: 3 × QF 4 in (102 mm) Mark IV guns (3×1); 1 × 2-pounder (40 mm) "pom-pom" Mk. II anti-aircraft gun (1×1); 4 × 21 in (533 mm) torpedo tubes (2×2)

HMS Oracle was a Repeat Admiralty M-class destroyer which served in the Royal Navy during the First World War. The M class were an improvement on the previous L-class, capable of higher speed. The vessel was launched in December 1915 and joined the Grand Fleet. Oracle spent much of the war involved in anti-submarine warfare. In August 1916, the destroyer rescued the crew of the light cruiser Nottingham, which had been sunk by a German submarine. In August 1917, the destroyer rammed and sank the submarine U-44. The warship subsequently operated as an escort for convoys. After the Armistice that marked the end of the First World War, the destroyer was transferred to Portsmouth. Initially, the destroyer was part of the local defence flotilla but soon Oracle was placed in reserve, decommissioned and, in October 1921, sold to be broken up.

== Design and development ==
Oracle was one of twenty-two Repeat Admiralty M-class destroyer destroyers ordered by the British Admiralty in November 1914 as part of the Third War Construction Programme. The M-class was an improved version of the earlier L-class destroyer destroyers, originally envisaged to reach the higher speed of 36 knots (67 km/h; 41 mph) in order to counter rumoured German fast destroyers, although the eventual specification was designed for a more economic 34 knots (63 km/h; 39 mph). It transpired that the German ships did not exist but the greater performance was appreciated by the British Royal Navy. The Repeat M class differed from the prewar vessels in having a raked stem and design improvements based on wartime experience.

The destroyer was 265 feet (80.77 m) long between perpendiculars, with a beam of 26 feet 9 inches (8.15 m) and a draught of 16 feet 3 inches (4.95 m). Displacement was 1,025 long tons (1,041 t) normal and 1,250 long tons (1,270 t) deep load. Power was provided by three Yarrow boilers feeding two Brown-Curtis steam turbines rated at 25,000 shaft horsepower (19,000 kW) and driving two shafts. Three funnels were fitted. A total of 268 long tons (272 t) of oil could be carried, including 40 long tons (41 t) in peace tanks that were not used in wartime, giving a range of 2,280 nautical miles (4,220 km; 2,620 mi) at 17 knots (31 km/h; 20 mph).

Armament consisted of three single QF 4-inch (102 mm) Mk IV guns on the ship's centreline, with one on the forecastle, one aft on a raised platform and one between the middle and aft funnels. Torpedo armament consisted of two twin mounts aft of the funnels for 21 in (533 mm) torpedoes. A single QF 2-pounder 40 mm (1.6 in) "pom-pom" anti-aircraft gun was mounted between the torpedo tubes. For anti-submarine warfare, Oracle was equipped with two chutes, initially each with a single depth charge. The number of depth charges carried increased as the war progressed. The ship had a complement of 80 officers and ratings.

== Construction and career ==
Laid down by William Doxford & Sons of Sunderland, Oracle was launched on 23 December 1915 and completed during August the following year. The destroyer was the first Royal Navy ship to be named after the Oracle, a prophet of antiquity. The vessel was deployed as part of the Grand Fleet, joining the Thirteenth Destroyer Flotilla at Scapa Flow. The destroyer was active in anti-submarine warfare but with variable results. On 19 August 1916, the destroyer, alongside sister ship Penn, was sent to destroy the German submarine U-52 that had sunk the light cruiser Nottingham. The destroyers failed to find the submarine, but did ensure many of the sailors were rescued.

On 18 January 1917, the destroyer was one of six destroyers that undertook patrols termed "high speed sweeps" in the North Sea using paravanes. No submarines were sighted. On 12 August, the destroyer had greater success. Patrolling with the light cruisers Birkenhead and Yarmouth, Oracle spotted a suspect object on the horizon northwest by west. The vessel was the submarine U-44, hastily disguised with a sail. The destroyer sped towards the submarine, which dived, rose and dived again in an attempt to escape. The destroyer discharged four rounds of gunfire, which missed, and then rammed the submarine between the conning tower and stern. The submarine sank with no survivors.

Between 1 and 10 October 1917, the flotilla took part in a large exercise to detect and trap German submarines in the North Sea. Although Oriole was not directly involved, three enemy boats were sunk in the operation. These were rare successes and the Admiralty withdrew the destroyers like Oracle from patrols and reallocated them to be escorts for convoys, which proved more effective at preventing losses from submarines. In October the following year, the destroyer was serving with the Fourth Destroyer Flotilla based at Devonport. The flotilla provided escorts for convoys sailing from the south.

After the armistice, the Grand Fleet was disbanded and Oracle joined the Defence Flotilla at Portsmouth. However, the end of the war meant that the Royal Navy returned to a peacetime level of mobilisation and both the number of ships and the amount of staff needed to be reduced to save money. Oracle was declared superfluous to operational requirements and, on 1 February 1920 and placed in reserve. However, that situation did not last long. The harsh conditions of wartime service, exacerbated by the fact that the hull was not galvanised and operations often required high speed in high seas, meant that the destroyer was worn out and ready for retirement. The destroyer was decommissioned and, on 30 October 1921, sold to W. & A.T. Burden to be broken up.

== Pennant numbers ==
| Pennant number | Date |
|---|---|
| G27 | September 1915 |
| F08 | January 1917 |
| D46 | January 1918 |
| F76 | January 1919 |
