= Admiralty M-class destroyer =

Class of destroyers of the Royal Navy

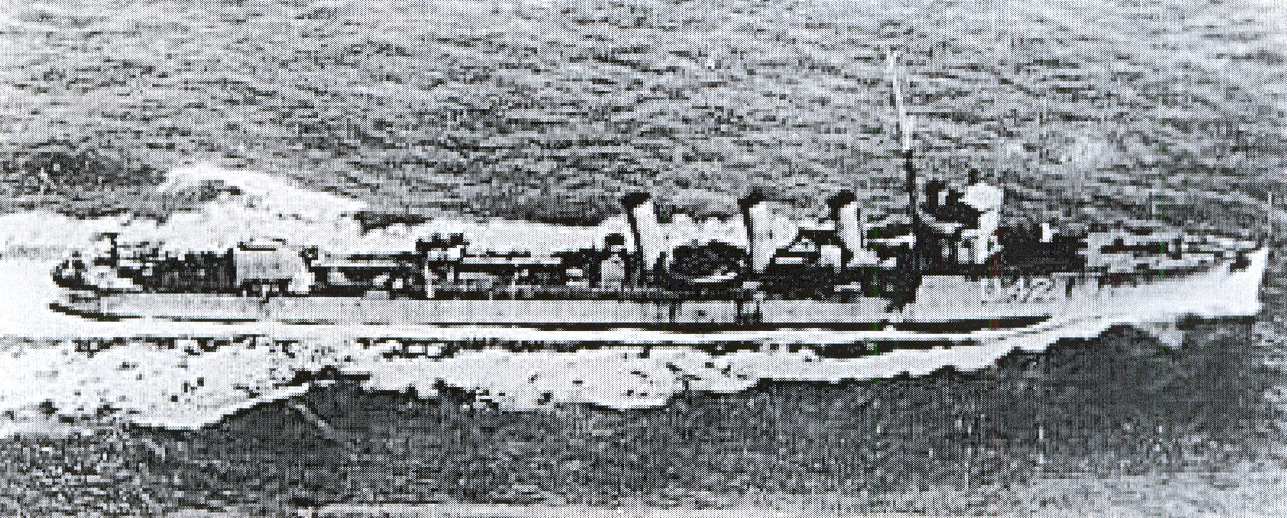
- HMS Pasley

Class overview
- Operators: Royal Navy
- Preceded by: L class
- Succeeded by: R class
- Subclasses: Thornycroft M class; Yarrow M class; Hawthorn M class; Yarrow Later M class
- Built: 1914–1916
- In commission: 1915–1923
- Completed: 85

General characteristics
- Type: Destroyer
- Displacement: 900 long tons (914 t) (normal); 1,100 long tons (1,118 t) full load
- Length: 273 ft 4 in (83.3 m) (o/a)
- Beam: 26 ft 8 in (8.1 m)
- Draught: 8 ft 6 in (2.6 m)
- Installed power: 4 Yarrow boilers; 25,000 shp (18,642 kW)
- Propulsion: 3 shafts; 1 steam turbine set
- Speed: 34 knots (63 km/h; 39 mph)
- Range: 3,710 nmi (6,870 km; 4,270 mi) at 15 knots (28 km/h; 17 mph)
- Complement: 80
- Armament: 3 × single 4 in (102 mm) guns; 2 × single 2-pdr (40 mm (1.6 in)) gun; 2 × twin 21 in (533 mm) torpedo tubes

The M class, more properly known as the Admiralty M class, were a class of 85 destroyers built for the Royal Navy of United Kingdom that saw service during World War I. All ships were built to an identical – Admiralty – design, hence the class name. Eighteen other vessels which were officially included within the 'M' class were built to variant designs by three specialist builders – 10 by Yarrow, 6 by Thornycroft (who also built another 6 to the standard Admiralty design), and 2 by Hawthorn Leslie; these are covered in other articles.

The Admiralty design was based on the preceding L class but modified to produce an increase in speed by approximately 6 knots (11 km/h; 6.9 mph). All ships built to the Admiralty design had three identical narrow, circular funnels (this did not apply to the 18 ships built by the specialist yards).

== Ships of the pre-war (1913–14) Programme ==
An original intention to order 20 destroyers in this year's Programme was reduced to 16 vessels. Three destroyers already under construction were purchased from Yarrow, two from Thornycroft and two from Hawthorn Leslie to these builders' individual designs, and these are listed in separate articles. Three further ships had been projected under the Programme – and named Marksman, Menace and Monitor; however these three ships were cancelled before being contracted to any specific builder (although J. Samuel White & Company, at Cowes were the intended builder), in favour of two Marksman-class leaders. Thus just six vessels were built to the Admiralty design under the 1913–14 Naval Programme. These differed from the wartime vessels by being 1,010 tons full load, with slightly smaller dimensions.

Name	Ship Builder	Laid down	Launched	Completed	Fate
Matchless	Swan Hunter & Wigham Richardson, Wallsend on Tyne	8 November 1913	5 October 1914	December 1914	Sold for scrapping on 26 October 1921.
Murray	Palmers Shipbuilding & Iron Company, Hebburn on Tyne	4 December 1913	8 August 1914	December 1914	Sold for scrapping on 9 May 1921.
Myngs	Palmers, Hebburn on Tyne	31 December 1913	24 September 1914	February 1915	Sold for scrapping on 9 May 1921.
Milne	John Brown & Company, Clydebank	18 December 1913	5 October 1914	December 1914	Sold for scrapping on 22 September 1921.
Morris	John Brown, Clydebank	20 January 1914	19 November 1914	December 1914	Sold for scrapping on 8 November 1921.
Moorsom	John Brown, Clydebank	15 January 1914	21 December 1914	February 1915	Sold for scrapping on 8 November 1921.

== Ships of the Emergency War Construction Programme ==
All the following vessels were ordered in five batches as part of the War Emergency Programme. Wartime builds omitted the cruising turbines originally specified and carried by the pre-war sub-group. The funnel heights were also raised compared with the pre-war vessels, and the second 4 in gun was mounted on a bandstand, as with the earlier L-class destroyers. Partridge, Norman, Maenad, Ophelia and Observer were later fitted to carry a kite balloon.

=== 1st War Programme ===
Sixteen vessels were ordered in September 1914 (as well as four of the Yarrow M class), but part of their cost was met by the provision in the 1914–1915 Programme for ten destroyers.

Name	Ship Builder	Begun	Launched	Completed	Fate
Mons	John Brown	30 September 1914	1 May 1915	July 1915	Sold for breaking up 8 November 1921.
Marne	John Brown	30 September 1913	29 May 1915	August 1916	Sold for breaking up 29 September 1921.
Michael	John I. Thornycroft & Company, Woolston	October 1914	19 May 1915	August 1915	Sold for breaking up 22 September 1921.
Milbrook	Thornycroft	November 1914	12 July 1915	October 1915	Sold for breaking up 22 September 1921.
Minion	Thornycroft	November 1914	11 September 1915	November 1915	Sold for breaking up 8 November 1921.
Munster	Thornycroft	November 1914	24 November 1915	January 1916	Sold for breaking up 15 November 1921.
Mystic	William Denny & Brothers, Dumbarton	27 October 1914	20 June 1915	11 November 1915	Sold for breaking up 8 November 1921.
Maenad	Denny	10 November 1914	10 August 1915	12 November 1915	Sold for breaking up 22 September 1921.
Magic	J. Samuel White & Company, Cowes	1 January 1915	10 September 1915	8 January 1916	Sold for breaking up 22 September 1921.
Moresby	White	14 January 1915	20 November 1915	7 April 1916	Sold for breaking up 9 May 1921.
Mandate	Fairfield Shipbuilding & Engineering Company, Govan		27 April 1915	13 August 1915	Sold for breaking up 22 September 1921.
Manners	Fairfield		15 June 1915	21 September 1915	Sold for breaking up 26 October 1921.
Marmion	Swan Hunter		28 May 1915		Sunk after collision with Tirade on 21 October 1917 off Lerwick.
Martial	Swan Hunter	October 1914	1 July 1915	October 1915	Sold for breaking up 9 May 1921.
Mary Rose	Swan Hunter		8 October 1915		Sunk on 17 October 1917 by German cruisers SMS Brummer and SMS Bremse off the Norwegian coast.
Menace	Swan Hunter	September 1914	9 November 1915	April 1916	Sold for breaking up 9 May 1921.

=== 2nd War Programme ===
Nine further vessels were ordered in early November 1914 (as well as one further Yarrow M class).

Name	Ship Builder	Laid Down	Launched	Completed	Fate
Mameluke	John Brown	23 December 1914	14 August 1915	October 1915	Sold for breaking up 22 September 1921.
Marvel	Denny	11 January 1915	7 October 1915	28 December 1915	Sold for breaking up 9 May 1921.
Mindful	Fairfield		24 August 1915	10 November 1915	Sold for breaking up 22 September 1921.
Mischief	Fairfield		12 October 1915	16 December 1915	Sold for breaking up 8 November 1921.
Nonsuch	Palmers		7 December 1915	February 1916	Sold for breaking up 9 May 1921.
Negro	Palmers		8 March 1915		Sunk after colliding with Hoste in the North Sea on 21 December 1916;depth charges from Hoste exploded and blew out the Negro's hull plating.
Nepean	Thornycroft	February 1915	22 January 1916	March 1916	Sold for breaking up 15 November 1921.
Nereus	Thornycroft	March 1915	24 February 1916	May 1916	Sold for breaking up 15 November 1921.
Nessus	Swan Hunter		24 August 1915		Sunk after colliding with HMS Amphitrite in the North Sea on 8 September 1916.

=== 3rd War Programme ===
Twenty-two further vessels were ordered in late November 1914.

Name	Ship Builder	Laid Down	Launched	Completed	Fate
Nestor	Swan Hunter		22 December 1915		Sunk on 31 May 1916 at the Battle of Jutland.
Noble	Alexander Stephen & Sons, Linthouse	6 February 1915	22 December 1915	15 February 1916	Sold for breaking up 8 November 1921.
Nomad	Stephen		7 February 1916		Sunk on 31 May 1916 at the Battle of Jutland.
Nizam	Stephen	11 February 1915	7 February 1916	by William Beardmore & Company, Dalmuir, 29 June 1916	Sold for breaking up 8 November 1921.
Nonpareil	Stephen	24 February 1915	7 February 1916	28 June 1916	Sold for breaking up 9 May 1921.
Norman	Palmers		20 March 1916	August 1916	Sold for breaking up 9 May 1921.
Northesk	Palmers		5 July 1916	October 1916	Sold for breaking up 9 May 1921.
North Star	Palmers		9 November 1916		Sunk on 23 April 1918 at Zeebrugge.
Nugent	Palmers		9 November 1916	April 1917	Sold for breaking up 9 May 1921.
Obedient	Scotts Shipbuilding and Engineering Company Limited, Greenock		6 November 1916	February 1917	Sold for breaking up 25 November 1921.
Obdurate	Scotts		21 November 1916	March 1917	Sold for breaking up 15 November 1921.
Onslaught	Scotts		21 November 1916		Sold for breaking up 30 October 1921. Some sources claimed that she torpedoed and sank the pre-dreadnought battleship SMS Pommern, while others claimed that Faulknor sank her.
Onslow	Fairfield		15 February 1916	15 April 1916	Sold for breaking up 26 October 1921.
Opal	William Doxford & Sons, Sunderland		11 September 1915		Wrecked off Scapa Flow with Narborough on 12 January 1918 (one survivor).
Ophelia	Doxford		13 October 1915	May 1916	Sold for breaking up 8 November 1921.
Opportune	Doxford		20 November 1915	June 1916	Sold for breaking up 7 December 1923.
Oracle	Doxford		23 December 1915	August 1916	Sold for breaking up 31 October 1921.
Orestes	Doxford		21 March 1916	June 1916	Sold for breaking up 31 October 1921.
Orford	Doxford		19 April 1916	December 1916	Sold for breaking up 1 November 1921.
Orpheus	Doxford		17 June 1916	September 1916	Sold for breaking up 31 October 1921.
Octavia	Doxford		21 June 1916	November 1916	Sold for breaking up 5 November 1921.
Ossory	John Brown	23 December 1914	9 October 1915	November 1915	Sold for breaking up 8 November 1921.

=== 4th War Programme ===
Sixteen further vessels were ordered in February 1915 (as well as two more of the Thornycroft M class). The eight last-named below of these were of the Repeat M subgroup with raking stems compared with the straight stems of the previous sub-group, and the bows were more flared to improve seakeeping qualities.

Name	Ship Builder	Laid Down	Launched	Completed	Fate
Napier	John Brown	24 March 1915	27 November 1915	January 1916	Sold for breaking up 8 November 1921.
Narborough	John Brown	May 1915	2 March 1916		Wrecked off Scapa Flow (with Opal) on 12 January 1918 (no survivors).
Narwhal	Denny	21 April 1915	3 February 1916	3 March 1916	Collided with another vessel in 1919 and broken up in 1920 at Devonport Dockyard.
Nicator	Denny	21 April 1915	3 February 1916	15 April 1916	Sold for breaking up 9 May 1921.
Norseman	Doxford		15 August 1916	November 1916	Sold for breaking up 9 May 1921.
Oberon	Doxford		29 September 1916	December 1916	Sold for breaking up 9 May 1921.
Observer	Fairfield	1 June 1915	1 May 1916	15 June 1916	Sold for breaking up 30 October 1921.
Offa	Fairfield	6 July 1915	7 June 1916	31 July 1916	Sold for breaking up 30 October 1921.
Orcadia	Fairfield	24 June 1915	26 July 1916	29 September 1916	Sold for breaking up 31 October 1921.
Oriole	Palmers		31 July 1916	November 1916	Sold for breaking up 9 May 1921.
Osiris	Palmers		28 September 1916	December 1916	Sold for breaking up 9 May 1921.
Paladin	Scotts	May 1915	27 March 1916	May 1916	Sold for breaking up 9 May 1921.
Parthian	Scotts	July 1915	3 July 1916	September 1916	Sold for breaking up 8 November 1921.
Partridge	Swan Hunter	July 1915	4 March 1916	December 1916	Sunk on 12 December 1917 by gunfire from the German destroyers G 101, G 103, G 104, and V 100 off Norwegian coast.
Pasley	Swan Hunter	July 1915	15 April 1916	July 1916	Sold for breaking up 9 May 1921.

=== 5th War Programme ===
Eighteen final vessels were ordered in May 1915 (as well as two of the Thornycroft M class and two of the Yarrow M class). However, two of the eighteen were fitted with geared turbines and became the prototypes for the Admiralty R class destroyers (these were the Radstock and Raider, and are listed with the R class). The other sixteen were all to the Admiralty design were of the Repeat M subgroup with raking stems apart from the two ships ordered from White as Redmill and Redwing, which were completed to the earlier 'M' Class design and were renamed Medina and Medway while building.

Name	Ship Builder	Laid Down	Launched	Completed	Fate
Medina (ex-Redmill)	White	23 September 1915	8 March 1916	30 June 1916	Sold for breaking up 9 May 1921.
Medway (ex-Medora, ex-Redwing)	White	2 November 1915	19 April 1916	2 August 1916	Sold for breaking up 9 May 1921.
Pelican	William Beardmore & Company, Dalmuir	25 June 1915	18 March 1916	1 May 1916	Sold for breaking up 9 May 1921.
Pellew	Beardmore	28 June 1915	8 May 1916	30 June 1916	Sold for breaking up 9 May 1921.
Penn	John Brown	9 June 1915	8 April 1916	May 1916	Sold for breaking up 31 October 1921.
Peregrine	John Brown	9 June 1915	29 May 1916	July 1916	Sold for breaking up 15 November 1921.
Petard	Denny	5 July 1915	24 March 1916	23 May 1916	Sold for breaking up 9 May 1921.
Peyton	Denny	12 July 1915	2 May 1916	29 June 1916	Sold for breaking up 9 May 1921.
Pheasant	Fairfield		23 October 1916		Mined on 1 March 1917 off the Orkney Islands.
Phoebe	Fairfield	20 November 1916		28 December 1916	Sold for breaking up 15 November 1921.
Pigeon	Hawthorn Leslie & Company, Hebburn	14 July 1915	3 March 1916	2 June 1916	Sold for breaking up 9 May 1921.
Plover	Hawthorn Leslie	30 July 1915	3 March 1916	30 June 1916	Sold for breaking up 9 May 1921.
Plucky	Scotts	21 April 1916		July 1916	Sold for breaking up 9 May 1921.
Portia	Scotts	10 August 1916		October 1916	Sold for breaking up 9 May 1921.
Prince	Stephen	27 July 1915	26 July 1916	21 September 1916	Sold for breaking up 9 May 1921.
Pylades	Stephen	27 July 1915	28 September 1916	by Beardmore 30 December 1916	Sold for breaking up 9 May 1921.

== Bibliography ==
- Cocker, Maurice (1983). Destroyers of the Royal Navy, 1893–1981. London: Ian Allan. ISBN 0-7110-1075-7.
- Colledge, J. J.; Warlow, Ben (2006) [1969]. Ships of the Royal Navy: The Complete Record of All Fighting Ships of the Royal Navy from the 15th Century to the Present (3rd Rev ed.). London: Chatham Publishing. ISBN 978-1-86176-281-8. OCLC 67375475.
- Dittmar, Fred; Colledge, Jim (1972). British Warships 1914–1919. London: Ian Allan. ISBN 0-7110-0380-7.
- Friedman, Norman (2009). British Destroyers: From Earliest Days to the First World War. Barnsley: Seaforth Publishing. ISBN 978-1-84832-049-9.
- Jane's Fighting Ships, 1919, Jane's Publishing.
