= Action off Lerwick =

WWI British-German naval engagement

- Part of The First World War
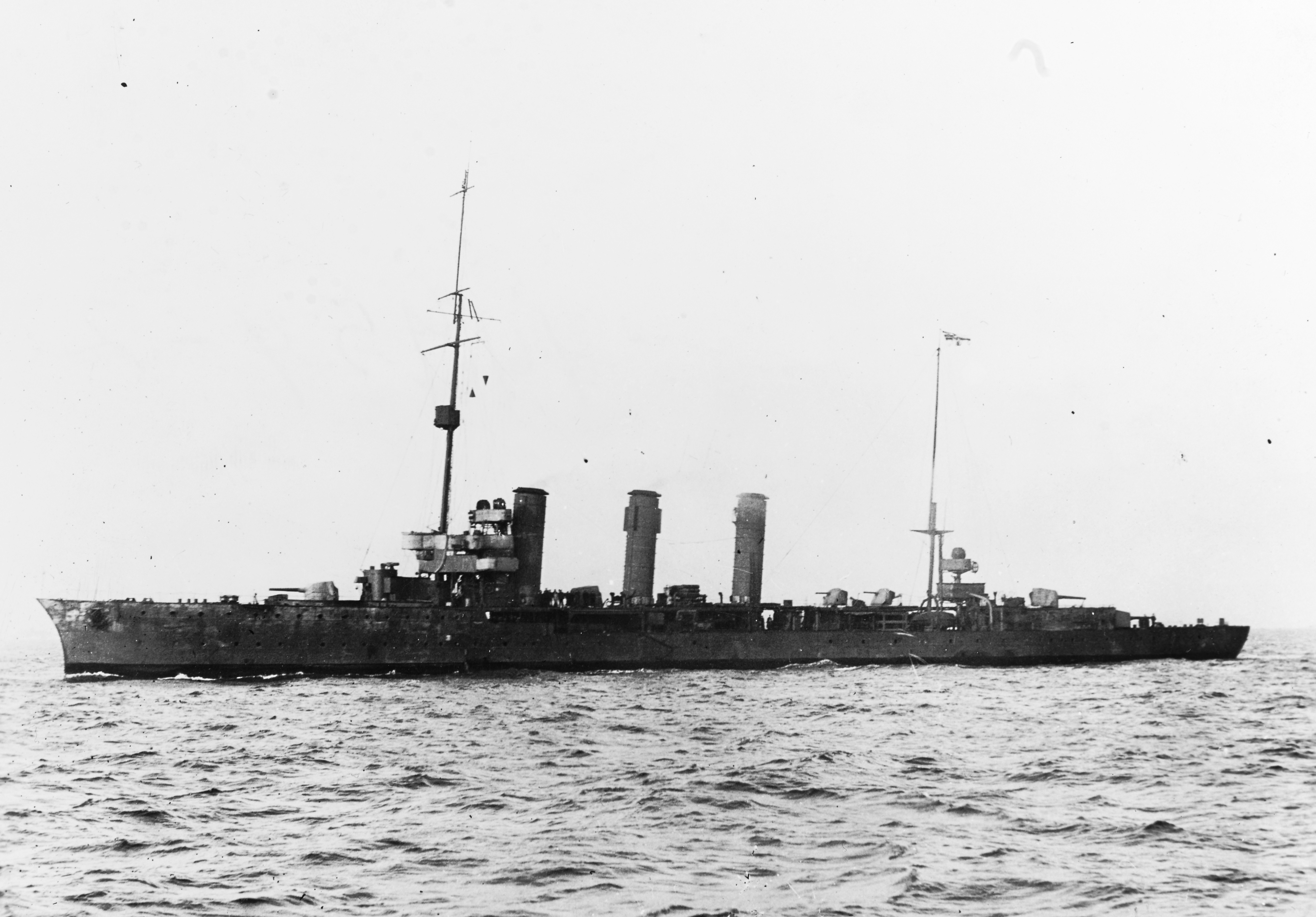
- SMS Bremse, a Brummer-class cruiser, probably on the way to internment at Scapa Flow in 1918
Date	17 October 1917
Location	North Sea, off Lerwick, Shetland Islands 60°09′18″N 01°08′42″E
Result	German victory

Belligerents
United Kingdom	German Empire

Commanders and leaders
Charles Fox †; Edward Brooke	Max Leonhardi; Siegfried Westerkamp

Strength
2 destroyers; 2 naval trawlers; 12 merchant ships	2 light cruisers

Casualties and losses
Killed: 135 RN; 36 neutral mariners; Sunk: 9 freighters; 2 destroyers	
- Action off Lerwick

The action off Lerwick (/ˈlɛrɪk/, "Lerrick") was a naval engagement on 17 October 1917 fought in the North Sea during the First World War. The German light, minelaying cruisers SMS Brummer and Bremse attacked a westbound convoy of twelve colliers and other merchant ships and their escorts, part of the regular Scandinavian convoy. The two escorting destroyers and nine neutral Scandinavian ships were sunk off Shetland, Scotland.

Admiralty code breakers had uncovered the call signs of Bremse and Brummer and by direction finding knew that they had sailed from Wilhelmshaven to Lister Tief (Lister Deep) north of Sylt but an operation as far north as the Scandinavian convoy collier route was not anticipated by the British naval commanders because the Admiralty failed promptly to pass on the information.

Both of the British destroyer commanders were commended for their bravery, though some members of the Admiralty felt that by leaving the convoy to engage a superior enemy force, they had left the merchant ships open to attack. Other British ships did not receive reports of the attack until late afternoon, were not in a position to intercept and the German cruisers returned safely to port. The British called the attack on neutral vessels, giving no time for the crews to abandon ship, an outrage.

The Germans denied allegations that their ships had fired on survivors in the water, despite the evidence of gunshot wounds to some crewmembers. Admiral David Beatty, the commander-in-chief of the Grand Fleet, severely criticised the Admiralty for failing to pass on information derived from the code-breakers of Room 40.

== Background ==
=== Neutral shipping ===
The German U-boat campaign inflicted serious losses on neutral shipping but British counter-measures along the east coast of Britain and in the North Sea, including escorted convoys, managed to limit the losses of Scandinavian merchant ships. British losses continued unabated and in the last three months of 1916 losses of 618,000 gross register tons (GRT) were matched by only 220,000 GRT of new ships. From January to March 1917, 912,000 GRT were lost for a replacement of 326,000 GRT. Neutral shipping was an important addition to the British merchant fleet but in the last quarter of 1916, non-British shipping losses, excluding those of the Central Powers were 1, 159,000 GRT and in the next three months were 1,619,000 against new building of 587,000 GRT (mostly US construction). British ships were being fitted with defensive armament, often a 4.7-inch gun with a naval crew. Neutrals were afraid to arm their ships and compromise their status as non-combatants, making them more vulnerable than the British ships.

=== Norway ===
In February 1917, the British government took soundings with several neutral governments over the purchase of their merchant fleets but the suggestion was spurned. In negotiations with the Norwegian government about the resumption of coal imports from Britain, the Norwegians were so desperate for coal that they offered the merchant fleet if the matter could be carried off without German reprisals. (Note: The British authorities involved in the economic blockade of Germany, had used access to British coal exports, to coerce neutral countries. Norway was forced into conforming to British orders in council, prohibiting exports to Germany. The British made a list of legitimate coal dealers, who received coal provided that they guaranteed not to re-export the coal or deliver it to German ships, businesses controlled by Germans or firms which sold products to Germany.) The suggestion was all the more compelling to the Norwegians because the British could requisition their ships with no provision for any supplies to Norway. In June 1917, about 300,000 people protested against rising food prices, 40,000 in the capital, Kristiania. The Norwegian prime minister, Gunnar Knudson, thought that another coal shortage would cause mass unemployment, social unrest and possibly revolution. It was suggested that rather than sell the fleet, the Norwegians should charter it and that armed British ships be substituted on the routes suffering the worst losses from German U-boats. The Norwegian Shipowners' Association (Norges Rederiforbund) accepted the Tonnage Agreement in which the transport of coal to Norway would be assured by British charter or requisition of the Rederiforbund ships. The connivance of the Norwegian government in the arrangement would be camouflaged by being made by the Rederiforbund and the Ministry of Shipping. The British gained 130 freighters of 200,000 GRT and the Norwegians 250,000 long tons (250,000 t) of coal per month. (Note: The disruption caused by the naval war Between Britain and Germany affected the other Scandinavian countries and in 1916, Sweden rationed sugar; bread flour, milk and meat following in 1917, potatoes in 1918.)

=== The Scandinavian convoy ===
In April 1917, the British began shipping coal north from the Humber Estuary to Lerwick in the Shetland Islands and then across the North Sea to Norway. Beginning in autumn 1914, six minesweeping trawlers sailed from each port on the east coast just before dawn and swept a channel 800 yd (730 m) wide and 200 nmi (370 km; 230 mi) long, the sweep being repeated late in the day. The swept channel was extended northwards to Scotland and the Orkney Islands. The monthly quota of 250,000 long tons (250,000 t) required daily convoys from Lerwick, most being neutral Scandinavian ships, usually escorted by two British destroyers from a pool of eight detached from the Grand Fleet, supported by several armed trawlers. (Note: HMS Marmion, Sarpedon, Mary Rose, Obedient, Strongbow, Tirade, Marvel, Morning Star, the cruiser Brilliant (depot ship) and the senior officer's ship, the old cruiser Leander.) To 1 July, 351 ships made the eastbound journey from Lerwick and 385 the voyage westwards from Norway, an average of 368 round trips a month, for the loss of twenty ships. In July, ten ships were sunk by the attacks of SM U-67, SM U-60, SM U-94, SM U-52 and SM UC-55, from 454, a loss of 2.2 per cent. Seven depth charge attacks were made by escort ships to no effect and HMS Itchen was torpedoed while escorting colliers northwards up the British coast to Lerwick. In anticipation of the added difficulty of escorting colliers in the autumn, winter and spring, several cruisers were sent to the Humber. The Scandinavian convoys had been a considerable success but had to sail in waters where they were vulnerable to German surface vessels for most of the journey. The return voyage began in Bergen in Norway, a neutral port where sailings could be observed by Germans and the use of neutral ships made it impossible for the British to keep convoy procedures and sailings secret.

=== Net mine barrage ===
Earlier in 1917, the Admiralty anticipated that U-boats would soon return to Germany. In early October 1917 another attack was planned. U-boats sailed between two minefields to the east of the Dogger Bank and the Outer Silver Pit, a funnel in the North Sea 315 nmi (362 mi; 583 km) long, 85 nmi (98 mi; 157 km) wide at the north end, narrowing to 45 nmi (52 mi; 83 km) at the southern end. A barrage of underwater mine nets were to be laid at the narrow end of the funnel. At the wide (northern) end, four submarines mounted a standing patrol and further south, two destroyer leaders, fourteen destroyers and a yacht patrolled between the Moray Firth and the Firth of Forth. Net drifter fishing boats, were to place nets in the funnel between the Firth of Forth and Flamborough Head. Four destroyers and sixteen trawlers, commanded from the yacht, HMY Goissa. The southernmost end of the funnel, where U-boats had to skirt the Dogger Bank minefields, was to be patrolled by Harwich Force. To maintain the standing patrols required between 15 and 29 destroyers and flotilla leaders, with 18 destroyers from Harwich Force, beginning on 27 September.

Storms interrupted the operation several times and the submarines, patrol ships and net barrage boats saw nothing of note during the operation. The net drifters reported nine underwater explosions as the nets were being strung out. The explosions were taken to be premature explosions of mines catching in the nets. As dark fell more explosions were heard, two green rockets were spotted at the east end of the net line and more explosions were heard. On 3 October, hydrophones detected a submarine at the west end of the nets, an explosion and then silence; other boats' hydrophone sets gave similar indications. There was silence until 9 October, when the destroyer Tancred was attacked north of the net barrage. Before the U-boat was expected to reach the nets, another was seen and attacked, then a U-boat engine was heard clearly and a depth charge dropped. The weather had damaged the nets and mines and on 10 October the operation was terminated. The Director of Naval Intelligence reported a month later that three U-boats had been destroyed close to the mine trap; German sources later confirmed that SM U-50, SM U-66 and SM U-106 had been sunk.

== Prelude ==
=== High Seas Fleet ===
Location map showing Bergen in Norway

During late 1917, the commander of the High Seas Fleet, (Hochseeflotte) Admiral Reinhard Scheer, decided to augment the U-boat campaign with attacks on the Scandinavian convoys by surface ships. Scheer hoped to terrorise Scandinavian neutrals, who were co-operating with the British and sailing in convoys with naval escorts. Scheer anticipated that success would force the British to divert naval ships from counter-U-boat operations and create an opportunity to engage the Grand Fleet at an advantage. U-boat reports gave the impression that much shipping was moving between Lerwick and Bergen in Norway. German bases to the south of the route made a surprise attack at the east end of the convoy route by surface ships feasible. The short days and stormy weather in the autumn and winter increased the possibility that a sortie could go unobserved.

By forcing the British to reinforce the escorts of the Scandinavian convoy, a surface ship attack could help the wider U-boat campaign. The new, fast, minelaying light cruisers Brummer (Fregattenkapitän Max Leonhardi) and Bremse (Fregattenkapitän Siegfried Westerkamp), with a speed of 34 kn (39 mph; 63 km/h), each armed with four 5.9 in (150 mm) naval guns and two 3.5 in (89 mm) (22-pounder) anti-aircraft guns, were chosen for an operation against the Scandinavian convoy. The minelaying gear was taken off and the ships disguised to look like British C-class cruisers. Brummer and Bremse kept wireless silence and Brummer had a wireless interception team on board to jam British signals. On 17 October, a westbound convoy of two British, one Belgian, and nine Scandinavian ships was 65 nmi (75 mi; 120 km) off Lerwick.

=== Room 40 ===
In this section, the course of British code breaking and communication between the Admiralty, Beatty and ships at sea has anticipated events for continuity.

On 15 October, Room 40 decrypted a message from Brummer that "Most Secret Order 71950" had been put back to 16 October. The message contained notice that the ship would sail via Norman Deep, because Way Blue had been blocked by mines, asking that minesweeping be carried out. An hour later, Admiral Sir Henry Oliver, the Deputy Chief of the Naval Staff, dispatched a signal to Beatty, "Minelayer Brummer leaves via Norman Deep tomorrow 16 to northward probably for minelaying. She should be intercepted". More decodes became available to Oliver soon afterwards and should have suggested that minelaying might not be the reason for the sortie; wireless silence was unusually rigorous and a decoded message from the submarine SM UB-64 described much shipping off Lerwick. Late on 16 October, the light cruiser SMS Regensburg reported that it would be off List auf Sylt at the north end of the island of Sylt with destroyer escorts, corresponding to a signal from Brummer that afternoon. Signals were then decrypted ordering all U-boats to refrain from attacks on light cruisers, except when certain that they were British. Oliver had undertaken to pass on new data to ships at sea but failed to supply this, the inferences that could be drawn from them or to contact Beatty until eighteen hours later, by when the convoy had been attacked.

=== 15 October convoy ===
An eastbound convoy departed Lerwick on 15 October, escorted by the destroyers HMS Mary Rose (Lieutenant Commander Charles Fox, escort leader) and Strongbow (Lieutenant Commander Edward Brooke), with two naval trawlers, HMS Elise and P. Fannon. The destroyers were each armed with three 4-inch Mk IV (100 mm) guns, three 2-pounder pom-pom Mk II and two 21-inch (533 mm) torpedo tubes. Around noon on 16 October, Mary Rose left the convoy to join the next westbound convoy assembling at Bergen as Stongbow saw to the dispersal of the eastbound colliers to their destinations. Mary Rose departed from Bergen with the westbound convoy, comprising one Danish, five Norwegian, three Swedish, two British and a Belgian freighter, on the afternoon of 16 October. Mary Rose sailed beyond the convoy and after dark, when Strongbow made rendezvous, the destroyers were unable to communicate. Strongbow sailed on the port side of the convoy. The night of 16/17 October passed quietly and by 6:00 a.m. on 17 October, half an hour after dawn, Mary Rose was still ahead of the convoy. There was a fresh [17–21 kn (20–24 mph; 31–39 km/h)] breeze blowing from the south-west and a heavy swell in good visibility. The escorts had not been informed of the sailing of a German surface force, the steps taken to intercept them or that an alarm covering the North Sea had been in force for two days.

=== Grand Fleet ===
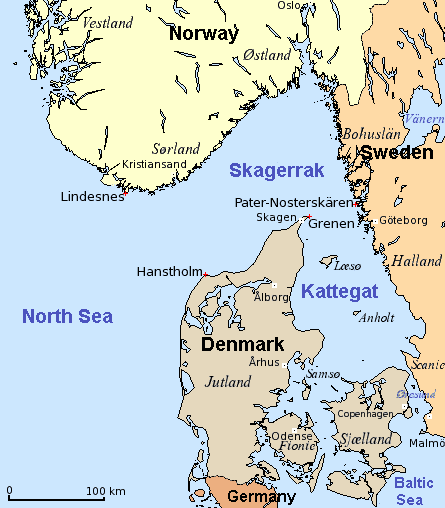
Chart of the Skagerrak

After the success of the mine trap at the beginning of October and the mines laid across the Heligoland Bight, U-boats had begun to use the Kattegat into the Baltic Sea for transit. German minesweepers were constantly busy clearing mines with battleships in support in case of British attacks. The British devised a plan to lay mines close to the German coast and river mouths to take advantage of the High Seas Fleet operating temporarily in the Baltic. While the arrangements were being made, four light cruisers, twelve destroyers and a destroyer leader were ordered to attack the German minesweepers operating in the German Bight. The Admiralty postponed the cruiser operation against German minesweepers and ordered all light cruisers and the twelve destroyers to prepare to sail to intercept a German surface force believed to be in the North Sea.

Ignorant that the Admiralty was failing to pass on information, Admiral David Beatty, the commander of the Grand Fleet, was constrained to scour the North Sea. Six light cruisers and six destroyers from Rosyth were ordered to the Bovbierg Light by 6:00 a.m. on 16 October, to patrol a line south-west from Denmark towards the Horns Reef channel, a gap in a shallow sandy reef of glacial deposits in the North Sea, about 7.8 nmi (9.0 mi; 14.4 km) off Blåvandshuk, the westernmost point of Denmark. A light cruiser squadron from Scapa Flow, accompanied by five destroyers, was to be off Jaederens Point in south-western Norway by 4:00 a.m., to observe a line from the point to Hanstholm in north Denmark, across the west end of the Skagerrak. Two more light cruiser squadrons, each with five or six destroyers, were sent to patrol lines in the central North Sea by noon on 16 October. After notice from the Admiralty that Zeppelins would be reconnoitring on the same day, Beatty ordered HMS Furious, a battlecruiser which carried aircraft, to conduct a sweep eastwards from just north of Middlesbrough.

== Action ==
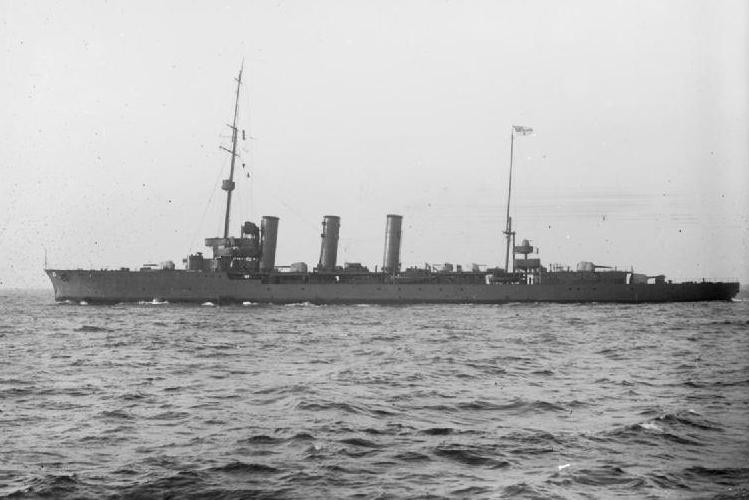
SMS Brummer (en route to Rosyth after the Armistice)

Soon after 6:00 a.m. on 17 October at about 60°13′N 1°06′E there was a south-westerly wind, heavy swell and poor light, visibility no more than 4,000 yd (2.0 nmi; 3.7 km). Lookouts on Strongbow spotted two unusual vessels converging on the destroyer; three challenges were signalled to the ships and the third challenge received an erroneous reply. Brooke called the ship to action stations. When the range was down to within 3,000 yd (1.5 nmi; 2.7 km) and before the crew could reach action stations, the German ships opened fire with their 5.9 in (150 mm) guns. The first German salvoes at Strongbow cut the main steam-pipe; many members of the crew below decks were scalded to death; Brooke was wounded and the ship was left dead in the water, with its decks covered with casualties. Other hits knocked out the wireless before the signaller could raise the alarm.

Mary Rose also sent a wireless signal as it closed with the German ships and another station asked for the signal to be repeated but Brummer jammed the signal. The German ships jammed every subsequent attempt by the British to transmit a distress call. Brooke ensured that the codebooks and confidential papers had been jettisoned then ordered the ship to be scuttled; the survivors took to the water in a Carley float at about 7:30 a.m. The German cruisers inflicted more damage on Strongbow while Elise was manoeuvring to rescue the crew and the ship sank at about 9:30 a.m. Four of the merchantmen were sunk with gunfire; Fox heard the noise astern, assumed that a U-boat had attacked the convoy and turned towards it, with enough time to go to action stations, hampered by not being able to use the torpedoes and guns at the same time, because the range and deflection transmitters were not working. Fox soon saw the German cruisers and attacked at high speed, opening fire at about 6:20 a.m. from a range of 6,000 to 7,000 yd (3.0 to 3.5 nmi; 3.4 to 4.0 mi; 5.5 to 6.4 km). The nearest German ship replied with erratic fire but at 2,000 yd (0.99 nmi; 1.1 mi; 1.8 km), as Fox changed course, the German ships hit Mary Rose at about 7:00 a.m. Fox gave the order "abandon ship" and eight men got away on a Carley float.

The German ships fired on the Carley float and a motor boat carrying survivors of Strongbow. With Mary Rose sunk, the Germans returned their attention to the freighters; the Germans ignored prize rules, firing at the merchant ships without giving time for the crews to abandon them. The Danish Margrethe had stopped engines as soon as the attack began but was fired on as boats were lowered; as the lifeboats were rowed away, astern of Margrethe, shells fell close by. With the ship on fire and the boilers exploding, Bremse and Brummer attacked the other ships, sinking five more. The wreck of Margrethe was sunk by Bremse and Brummer with broadsides from both beams as they left the area, making for home at 8:20 a.m. P. Fannon, the two British and the Belgian ships escaped; Elise returned when the coast was clear to rescue survivors, including 45 men from the crew of Strongbow, and 29 Norwegians and Danes from the cargo ships. (The survivors from Mary Rose reached Norway and were tended by lighthouse keepers.) Attempts by the British ships to send wireless messages having failed, British naval forces in the area continued a search for a minelayer.

The Admiralty thought that the German ships were still in port but postponed the Lerwick to Norway sailing due on 18 October, prompting Beatty to ask for clarification. Oliver sent a report at 2:20 p.m. suggesting that the ships were chasing convoys (Bremse and Brummer were north of Bergen, running south for Horns Reef). At about 3:30 p.m. Elise encountered the destroyers HMS Marmion and Obedient; news of the German attack was signalled to the commodore of flotillas. Sir Frederic Brock, the Admiral Commanding, Orkneys and Shetlands received the signal at 3:50 p.m. and Beatty was informed between 4:00 p.m. and 5:00 p.m. when the German ships were north of Stavanger. Beatty sent new orders to the ships out on patrol at 6:15 p.m. to sail eastwards and intercept the German cruisers at Horns Reef at dawn but by then the ships were off Denmark. The German ships maintained wireless silence until early on 18 October, when the British code breakers decrypted an intercepted signal from Brummer that the "first task had been carried out but that the second task had fallen through" and that the two cruisers were off the Lyngvig Fyr (Lighthouse) at Hvide Sande in north-west Denmark.

== Aftermath ==
=== Analysis ===
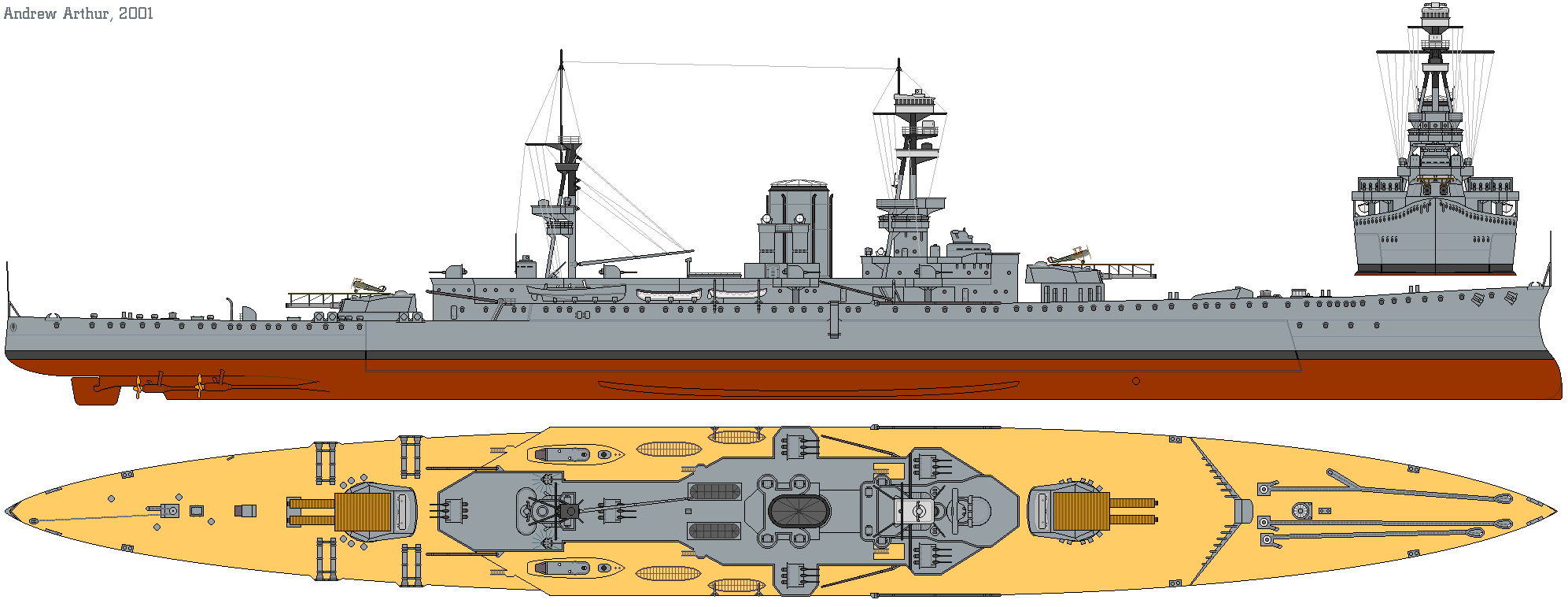
HMS Glorious in 1917

In 1983, Patrick Beesly wrote that the German attack had been well planned and efficiently carried out but that the Admiralty should have been more effective in its countermeasures. At 2:20 p.m. on 17 October, Oliver signalled to Beatty,

"It is just possible Brummer (sic) may be accompanied by one or perhaps two light cruisers but if this is the case she has not yet left. Enemy has warned all submarines not to attack light cruisers unless certain they are hostile. This may indicate intention to operate on East coast or to attack Lerwick or other convoys. In order to be prepared it seems desirable to withdraw HMS Courageous and Glorious to Scapa to refuel and also 1st Light Cruiser Squadron..." just under an hour later Oliver signalled to Beatty, "practically certain that light cruisers are not with Brummer (sic) and are remaining in the Bight".

Beesly wrote that had Beatty received the signal during the evening of 16 October, rather than after an eighteen-hour delay, he would have probably issued different orders, with more chance to protect the convoy and sink the cruisers. Beesly called the failure to communicate inexcusable; contemporary records show that all decodes were sent by Room 40 to the Operations Division with, at most, a fifty-minute delay since interception. Room 40 was not allowed knowledge of the positions of British ships which, with the decrypts, would have shown the peril which the Scandinavian convoys faced. The Operations Division keep a plot and received the data from Room 40; Beesly called the failure to communicate another example of "Oliver's many inexplicable failures to make proper use of the priceless intelligence at his disposal".

In 1994, Paul Halpern wrote that the Admiralty was still overly secretive of its code-breaking activities and lack of liaison between departments led to failures of interpretation of information. Room 40 discovered from its call sign that Brummer had sailed and assumed that it was on a mine laying sortie but was kept in ignorance of British ship movements, information on which was reserved for the Operations Division. Had the code-breakers been privy to this information they might have inferred German intentions. Halpern also wrote that it was remiss of the Operations Division to not consider that the German ships were out to attack a convoy and to take so long to communicate with Beatty, who, with some asperity, laid blame on the Admiralty in the aftermath.

The German newspapers trumpeted the success,

Where is the British fleet? It can neither guard its own waters nor those of its Allies....Ever since the Skaggerak [Battle of Jutland], little England has been aware that she has to deal with an adversary of equal strength and therefore avoids a chivalrous battle on the sea and only wages a hunger war.

— Cologne Gazette (Kölner Stadt-Anzeiger)

a claim by the Swedish captain of SS Visbur was publicised that the British trawlers had rescued British sailors and abandoned the Scandinavian survivors. In Britain, the Daily Mail blamed the government and the Admiralty for the failure, much to the disdain of at least one of the officers on the Scandinavian convoy route who called the Mail a beastly paper in his diary. In 1969, Arthur Marder wrote that the fiasco was regarded as an outrage by the Allies, who protested that the attack on neutral ships was illegal and that the Germans gave the crews of the merchant vessels no time to evacuate, which caused so many civilian casualties. Both of the British destroyer commanders received credit for bravery, though some members of the Admiralty felt that by leaving the convoy to engage a superior enemy force, they had left the merchant steamers open to attack.

Courts of enquiry were held into the losses of Strongbow and Mary Rose; the inquiry into the loss of Strongbow found grounds for regret that the German ships were challenged three times before the captain called the crew to action stations. The findings of the hearing into the loss of Mary Rose concluded that while Fox and his crew fought bravely, by choosing to attack the German ships Fox left the convoy without protection when he could have held off and concentrated on transmitting sighting reports. Courts martial findings blamed Fox for not attacking with torpedoes but described his decisions as being "in the highest traditions of the service"; Brooke was blamed for not keeping at a distance but ruled that this was an error of judgement rather than a matter for disciplinary action.

In 2019, Steve Dunn wrote that the verdicts were unduly harsh, since after the war German records showed that Mary Rose sent a wireless message which received a reply before the German ships jammed subsequent signals. Dunn also wrote that defensive tactics were alien to the offensive culture of the Royal Navy. In his diary, the Cabinet Secretary Sir Maurice Hankey, wrote that, despite the Admiralty having been warned of a likely attack by a reliable source, it had bungled; Sir Eric Geddes blamed the First Sea Lord, Admiral John Jellicoe and wanted him replaced by Admiral Rosslyn Wemyss.

=== Casualties ===
Of the 98 crew of Mary Rose, 88 were killed, two officers and eight men surviving; the 86 crew of Strongbow suffered 47 killed. The Swedish H. Wikander suffered sixteen fatal casualties and the Norwegian Kristine ten of the eleven crewmen still on board while abandoning ship were killed; the mate was found in a boat dead of gunshot wounds with three wounded crewmembers. Captain Roeneviz, the master of Kristine was picked up by a lifeboat from Habil and said that after he ordered the crew to abandon ship, a shell hit the after lifeboat, killing seven men, at which the crew re-boarded Kristine and vainly signalled to the Germans to cease firing. Roeneviz told reporters later,

The shells were now directed at us amidships and my men were swept down into the sea, together with the vessel's superstructure.

— The Scotsman 22 October 1917

Thirty-six merchant sailors were killed and 119 survivors landed in Norway. The German ships were accused of shelling survivors in the water but the accusation was denied, despite evidence of gunshot wounds and the testimony of survivors.

=== Subsequent events ===
The Norwegian government sent a protest to the German Foreign Office (Auswärtiges Amt) against an infringement of freedom of the seas. The government claimed that German depredations were the reason for Norwegian ships joining convoys guarded by belligerents against Germany and called on Germany to order submarine commanders to refrain from endangering Norwegian sailors. At the Admiralty a conference was held on 22 October from which on 5 November Beatty and his staff made proposals to change the system of Scandinavian convoys. Convoys should sail from Methil Docks, on the north bank of the Firth of Forth, which was better equipped than Lerwick and closer to Swedish and Danish trade routes. The southward move would send convoys closer to German bases, against which the convoys should be integrated into the Atlantic convoy system, with cruiser protection. The next Scandinavian convoy sailed from Norway to Lerwick on 20 October. From 11 to 12 December the Germans undertook a more ambitious operation simultaneously to intercept a Scandinavian convoy and shipping on the route along the British east coast to Lerwick and back.

== German order of battle ==
=== Kaiserliche Marine ===
German raiding force
Ship	Flag	Type	Notes
Brummer	Imperial German Navy	Brummer-class cruiser	Minelaying cruiser
Bremse	Imperial German Navy	Brummer-class cruiser	Minelaying cruiser

== Allied order of battle ==
=== Royal Navy ===
Convoy escorts
Ship	Flag	Type	Notes
HMS Mary Rose	Royal Navy	Admiralty M-class destroyer	Flagship
HMS Strongbow	Royal Navy	Yarrow Later M-class destroyer	47 of 86 crew killed
HMT Elise	Royal Navy	Trawler	
HMT P. Fannon	Royal Navy	Trawler	

==== Convoy ====
Scandinavian convoy
Ship	Year	Flag	GRT	Notes
SS City of Cork	—	United Kingdom	—	
SS Ben Cleugh	1901	United Kingdom	4,159	
SS Londonier	1911	Belgium	5,216	
SS Margrethe	1882	Denmark	1,243	Sunk
SS Dagbjørg	1914	Norway	787	Sunk
SS Habil	1896	Norway	636	Sunk
SS Silja	1905	Norway	1,231	Sunk
SS Sørhaug	1898	Norway	1,007	Sunk
SS Kristine	1889	Norway	568	Sunk, 10† 1 surv.
SS Visbur	1911	Sweden	962	Sunk
SS H. Wicander	1892	Sweden	1,256	Sunk, 16†
SS Stella	1912	Sweden	836	Sunk
