= HMS Prince (1916) =

British M-Class destroyer

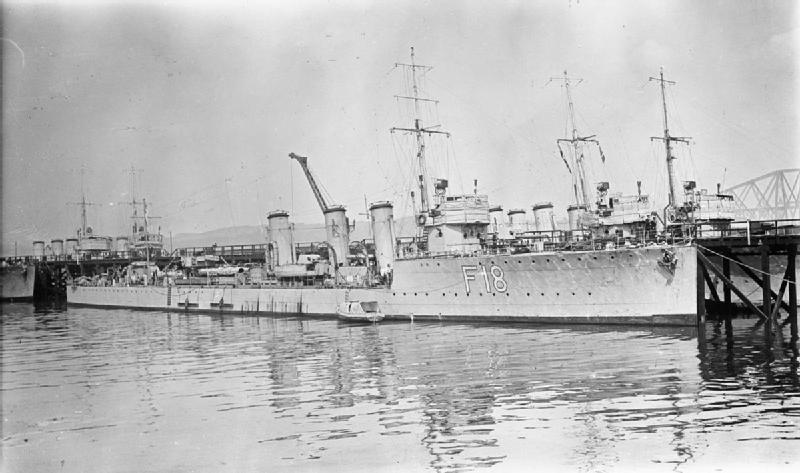
- Sister ship Paladin

History

United Kingdom
- Name: Prince
- Ordered: May 1915
- Builder: Stephens, Linthouse
- Laid down: 27 July 1915
- Launched: 26 June 1916
- Completed: 21 September 1916
- Out of service: 9 May 1921
- Fate: Sold to be broken up

General characteristics
- Class & type: Admiralty M-class destroyer
- Displacement: 1,026 long tons (1,042 t) (normal)
- Length: 273 ft 4 in (83.3 m) (o/a); 265 feet (80.8 m) (p.p.)
- Beam: 26 ft 8 in (8.1 m)
- Draught: 8 ft 11 in (2.7 m)
- Installed power: 3 Yarrow boilers, 27,800 shp (20,700 kW)
- Propulsion: Brown-Curtiss steam turbines, 3 shafts
- Speed: 34 knots (63 km/h; 39 mph)
- Range: 2,530 nmi (4,690 km; 2,910 mi) at 15 kn (28 km/h; 17 mph)
- Complement: 80
- Armament: 3 × single QF 4-inch (102 mm) guns; 2 × single 1-pdr 37 mm (1.5 in) AA guns; 2 × twin 21 in (533 mm) torpedo tubes

HMS Prince was a Repeat Admiralty M-class destroyer that served in the Royal Navy during the First World War. The M class was an improvement on those of the preceding L class, capable of higher speed. Launched in 1916, Prince joined the Twelfth Destroyer Flotilla of the Grand Fleet. The destroyer assisted in the rescue of the crew of the flotilla leader Hoste in 1916, laying down fuel oil on the sea in an attempt to create a calm enough environment to evacuate the sinking ship. The operation was successful and all the sailors were saved. In 1917, the ship formed part of the destroyer screen for the First Battle Squadron during the Second Battle of Heligoland Bight but saw no action. After the Armistice that ended the war, Prince was initially put in reserve and then sold in 1921 to be broken up.

== Design and development ==
Prince was one of 18 Repeat Admiralty M-class destroyers ordered by the British Admiralty in late May 1915 as part of the Fifth War Programme during the First World War. The M class was an improved version of the earlier L-class, required to reach a higher speed in order to counter rumoured new German fast destroyers. The remit was to have a maximum speed of 36 knots (67 km/h; 41 mph) and, although ultimately the destroyers fell short of that ambition in service, the extra performance that was achieved was valued by the navy. It transpired that the German warships did not exist.

The destroyer had a length of 265 ft (80.8 m) between perpendiculars and 273 ft 4 in (83.3 m) overall, with a beam of 26 ft 8 in (8.1 m) and draught of 8 ft 11 in (2.7 m). Displacement was 948 long tons (963 t) normal. Power was provided by three Yarrow boilers feeding Brown-Curtiss steam turbines built by Beardmore and rated at 27,800 shaft horsepower (20,700 kW). The turbines drove three shafts and exhausted through three funnels. Design speed was 34 knots (63 km/h; 39 mph). A total of 228 long tons (232 t) of oil was carried to give a design range of 2,530 nautical miles (4,690 km; 2,910 mi) at 15 knots (28 km/h; 17 mph). Actual endurance in service was less; sister ship Murray had a range of 2,240 nautical miles (4,150 km; 2,580 mi) at 15 knots (28 km/h; 17 mph).

Prince had a main armament consisting of three single QF 4-inch (102 mm) Mk IV guns on the centreline, with one on the forecastle, one aft on a raised platform and one between the middle and aft funnels. Torpedo armament consisted of two twin torpedo tubes for 21 in (533 mm) torpedoes located aft of the funnels. Two single 1-pounder 37 mm (1.5 in) "pom-pom" anti-aircraft guns were carried. The anti-aircraft guns were later replaced by 2-pdr 40 mm (1.6 in) "pom-pom" guns and the destroyer was also fitted with racks and storage for depth charges. The ship had a complement of 80 officers and ratings.

== Construction and career ==
Prince was laid down by Alexander Stephens on 27 July 1915 at Linthouse and launched on 26 June the following year. The vessel was completed on 21 September, the fifth to be given the name in Royal Navy service. The ship was deployed as part of the Grand Fleet, joining the Twelfth Destroyer Flotilla. The flotilla took part in a large exercise with other flotillas and fleets of the Grand Fleet, led by the dreadnought battleship Iron Duke, between 22 and 24 November. On 19 December, the destroyer joined the rest of the Grand Fleet in manoeuvres. During the exercise, the flotilla leader Hoste suffered a mechanical failure and hit the destroyer Negro, crippling both so that they needed to be evacuated. The sea conditions hindered the rescue of the sailors. Prince laid fuel oil on the sea in an attempt to create a calm. The entire crew was saved.

On 15 June the following year, the flotilla was deployed in an operation to find German submarines. On 21 June, the destroyer spotted a submarine on the surface, which may have been U-61 or U-82. The submarine dived before Prince could attack and, although, the destroyer dropped two depth charges, no damage was done to the vessel. On 16 November, the destroyer was deployed as part of the flotilla in response to the sortie of the German minesweepers, forming a screen to the First Battle Squadron. However, the destroyer took no part in the subsequent Second Battle of Heligoland Bight.

At the end of the war, Prince was a member of the Twentieth Destroyer Flotilla based on the Humber. After the Armistice that ended the war in 1918, the Royal Navy returned to a peacetime level of strength and both the number of ships and personnel needed to be reduced to save money. The destroyer was placed in reserve at Devonport. However, the harsh conditions of wartime operations, exacerbated by the fact that the hull was not galvanised, meant that the ship was soon worn out. Prince was retired, and, on 9 May 1921, was sold to Thos. W. Ward of Hayle to be broken up.

== Pennant numbers ==
Pennant number	Date
G77	September 1915
G43	January 1917
G42	January 1918
H37	January 1919
