= HMAS Anzac =

Three ships of the Royal Australian Navy have been named HMAS Anzac, after the Australian and New Zealand Army Corps (ANZAC).

- HMAS Anzac (1917), a Parker-class destroyer leader commissioned into the Royal Navy as HMS Anzac and presented to the Australian Government in 1919. The ship was paid off in 1931, and sunk as a target four years later.
- HMAS Anzac (D59), a Battle-class destroyer commissioned in 1951. The ship was paid off in 1974, and sold for scrap.
- HMAS Anzac (FFH 150), the lead ship of the Anzac class of frigates. The frigate was commissioned in 1996 and retired in 2024. She was scrapped in 2025.

== Battle honours ==
Five battle honours have been awarded to ships named HMAS Anzac:

- Korea 1951–53
- Malaya 1956
- East Timor 1999
- Persian Gulf 2001–03
- Iraq 2003

== See also ==
- HMS Anzac
