= HMS Anzac =

Two ships of the Royal Navy has borne the name HMS Anzac, after the Australian and New Zealand Army Corps (ANZAC). Another was planned but never completed:

- HMS Anzac, a trawler hired by the Admiralty in 1916 to serve as an auxiliary minesweeper. She was renamed HMS Anzac II in 1917, and remained in service until 1919
- HMS Anzac (1917) was a Parker-class flotilla leader launched in 1917, transferred to the Royal Australian Navy in 1919 as HMAS Anzac and sold in 1935.
- HMS Anzac (P431) was to have been an Amphion-class submarine, cancelled in 1945.

== See also ==
- HMAS Anzac
