= HMAS Anzac (FFH 150) =

Former Anzac-class frigate of Royal Australian Navy

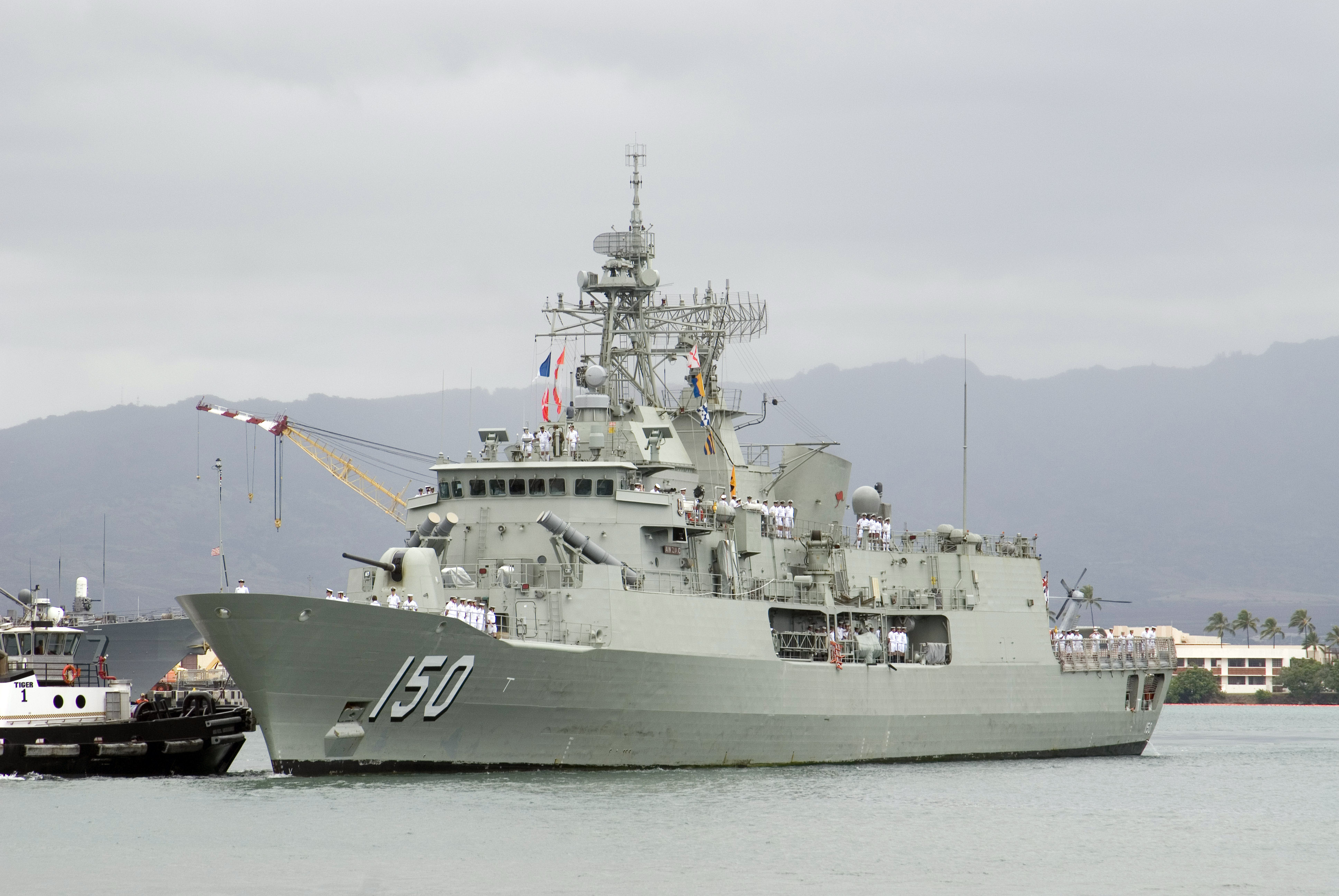
- HMAS Anzac arriving at Naval Station Pearl Harbor prior to participating in RIMPAC 2008.

History

Australia
- Namesake: Australia and New Zealand Army Corps
- Builder: Tenix Defence
- Laid down: 5 November 1993
- Launched: 16 September 1994
- Commissioned: 18 May 1996
- Decommissioned: 18 May 2024
- Home port: Fleet Base West, Perth
- Identification: MMSI number: 503109000; Callsign: VKNG
- Motto: "United We Stand"
- Honours and awards: Battle honours: East Timor 1999; Persian Gulf 2001–03; Iraq 2003; Two inherited battle honours; Awards: Meritorious Unit Citation
- Status: Scrapped 2025
- Badge

General characteristics
- Class & type: Anzac-class frigate
- Displacement: 3,810 tonnes full load
- Length: 118 m (387 ft)
- Beam: 15 m (49 ft)
- Draught: 4 m (13 ft)
- Propulsion: 1 × General Electric LM2500 gas turbine providing 30,000 hp (22.5 MW); 2 × MTU 12V 1163 TB83 diesels providing 8,840 hp (6.5 MW)
- Speed: 27 knots (50 km/h; 31 mph)
- Range: 6,000 nautical miles (11,000 km; 6,900 mi) at 18 knots (33 km/h; 21 mph)
- Complement: approximately 170 sailors
- Sensors & processing systems: Sonars: Thomson Sintra Spherion B Mod 5; hull-mounted; active search and attack; medium frequency. Provision for towed array; Air search radar: CEA Technologies CEAFAR2-L long range Active Phased Array Radar (L Band); Search radar: CEA Technologies CEAFAR Active Phased Array Radar (S Band); Navigation: Kelvin Hughes Sharpeye (I-band); Passive Detection: Sagem Vampir NG Infrared Search/track; Target Illumination Radar: CEA Technologies CEAMOUNT Active Phased Array Illuminator (X Band); Combat data systems: Saab 9LV 453 Mk 3E.Link 11& Link16; Weapons control: Saab 9LV 453 radar/optronic director with CEA Solid State Continuous Wave Illuminator
- Electronic warfare & decoys: ESM: Racal modified Sceptre A (radar intercept), Telefunken PST-1720 Telegon 10 (comms intercept); Countermeasures: Decoys: G & D Aircraft SRBOC Mk 36 Mod 1 decoy launchers for SRBOC, BAE Systems Nulka active missile decoy
- Armament: Guns and missiles: 1 × 5 in/54 (127 mm) Mk 45 Mod 2 gun; 2 × Rafael Mini Typhoon 12.7mm (.50 cal) CIWS; Small arms; 2 × 4 Harpoon Block II anti-ship missiles; Mk 41 Mod 5 VLS for Sea Sparrow and Evolved Sea Sparrow; Torpedoes: 2 × triple 324 mm Mk 32 Mod 5 tubes with MU 90 Torpedo
- Aircraft carried: 1 × Sikorsky MH-60R Seahawk
- Notes: Post-Anti-Ship Missile Defence Project upgrade. See class article for original configuration.

HMAS Anzac (FFH 150) was the lead ship of the Anzac-class frigates in use with the Royal Australian Navy (RAN) and the Royal New Zealand Navy (RNZN). Entering Australian service in 1996, the frigate operated as part of the INTERFET peacekeeping taskforce in 1999. In 2003, she was involved in the Battle of Al Faw, and became the first RAN ship to fire in anger since the Vietnam War.

In February 2024 it was announced by the Australian Government that HMAS Anzac would not sail again and be the first ship of her class to be decommissioned in the near future, followed by her sister ship HMAS Arunta in 2026. HMAS Anzac was decommissioned on 18 May 2024 after 28 years of service.

== Design and construction ==
The Anzac class originated from RAN plans to replace the six River-class destroyer escorts with a mid-capability patrol frigate. The Australian shipbuilding industry was thought to be incapable of warship design, so the RAN decided to take a proven foreign design and modify it. Around the same time, the Royal New Zealand Navy (RNZN) was looking to replace four Leander-class frigates; a deterioration in New Zealand-United States relations, the need to improve alliances with nearby nations, and the commonalities between the RAN and RNZN ships' requirements led the two nations to begin collaborating on the acquisition in 1987. Tenders were requested by the Anzac Ship Project at the end of 1986, with 12 ship designs (including an airship) submitted. By August 1987, the tenders were narrowed down in October to Blohm + Voss's MEKO 200 design, the M class (later Karel Doorman class) offered by Royal Schelde, and a scaled-down Type 23 frigate proposed by Yarrow Shipbuilders. In 1989, the Australian government announced that Melbourne-based shipbuilder AMECON (which became Tenix Defence) would build the modified MEKO 200 design. The Australians ordered eight ships, while New Zealand ordered two, with an unexercised option for two more.

The Anzacs are based on Blohm + Voss' MEKO 200 PN (or Vasco da Gama-class) frigates, modified to meet Australian and New Zealand specifications and maximise the use of locally built equipment. Each frigate has a 3,600-tonne (3,500-long-ton; 4,000-short-ton) full load displacement. The ships are 109 metres (358 ft) long at the waterline, and 118 metres (387 ft) long overall, with a beam of 14.8 metres (49 ft), and a full load draught of 4.35 metres (14.3 ft). A Combined Diesel or Gas (CODOG) propulsion machinery layout is used, with a single, 30,172-horsepower (22,499 kW) General Electric LM2500-30 gas turbine and two 8,840-horsepower (6,590 kW) MTU 12V1163 TB83 diesel engines driving the ship's two controllable-pitch propellers. Maximum speed is 27 knots (50 km/h; 31 mph), and maximum range is over 6,000 nautical miles (11,000 km; 6,900 mi) at 18 knots (33 km/h; 21 mph); about 50% greater than other MEKO 200 designs. The standard ship's company of an Anzac consists of 22 officers and 141 sailors.

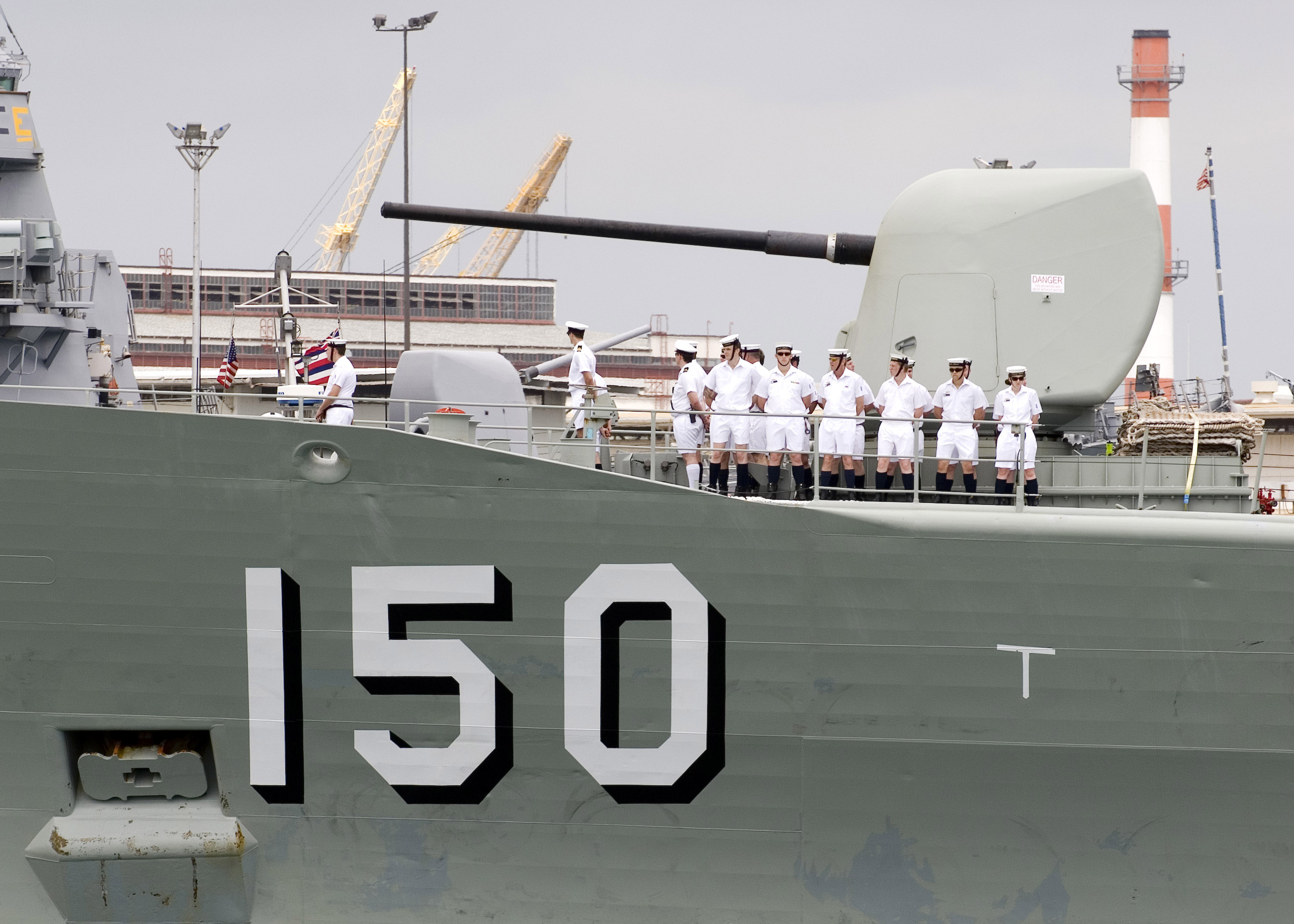
Sailors man the rails around Anzac's 5-inch 54 calibre Mark 45 gun

As designed, the main armament for the frigate is a 5-inch 54 calibre Mark 45 gun, supplemented by an eight-cell Mark 41 vertical launch system (for RIM-7 Sea Sparrow or RIM-162 Evolved Sea Sparrow missiles), two 12.7-millimetre (0.50 in) machine guns, and two Mark 32 triple torpedo tube sets (initially firing Mark 46 torpedoes, but later upgraded to use the MU90 Impact torpedo). They were also designed for but not with a Mark 15 Phalanx close-in weapons system (two Mini Typhoons fitted when required from 2005 onwards), two quad-canister Harpoon anti-ship missile launchers (which were installed across the RAN vessels from 2005 onwards), and a second 8-cell Mark 41 VLS (which has not been added). The Australian Anzacs used a single Sikorsky S-70B-2 Seahawk helicopter; plans to replace them with Kaman SH-2G Super Seasprites were cancelled in 2008 due to ongoing problems. Instead, the S-70B-2 was replaced with the Sikorsky MH-60R Seahawk by late 2017.

Anzac was laid down at Williamstown Dockyard on 5 November 1993. The ship was assembled from six hull modules and six superstructure modules, but unlike later ships in the class, which had modules fabricated at three sites, Anzac was built entirely at Williamstown. The frigate was launched on 16 September 1994 by Army nurse Vivian Statham. Anzac was commissioned into the RAN at Station Pier in Melbourne on 18 May 1996. The ship's name is in recognition of the Australian and New Zealand Army Corps (ANZACs) and their service during World War I.

== Operational history ==
In October 1997, Anzac conducted Operation Dirk supported by HMAS Westralia targeting illegal fishing vessels in the Southern Ocean catching the Patagonian toothfish around Heard Island and McDonald Islands in the Australian Fisheries Zone with the Salvora and the Aliza Glacial apprehended boarded by Clearance divers.

Anzac was deployed to East Timor as part of the Australian-led INTERFET peacekeeping taskforce from 19 to 29 September 1999. The ship was later awarded the battle honour "East Timor 1999" in recognition of this deployment.

29 October 2000 HMAS Anzac rendezvoused with CSIRO Research Vessel RV Franklin 300 nm west of Fremantle after answering a Mayday call during a port visit to Albany. In treacherous weather including, a six-metre swell, 40 knot winds and fading light HMAS Anzac launched a RHIB (Rigid Hulled Inflatable Boat) and transferred a medical team to RV Franklin to stabilise the patient and transfer back to the Anzac. The patient was transferred by helicopter the next day back to Perth when Anzac reached aircraft range. Anzac had embarked a news crew from GWN at Albany and Anzac crew were able to film some of the rescue. The medical team and boat crew received a Maritime Commanders Commendation. The boat crew also received a CN commendation.

Between 2001 and 2003, Anzac was deployed to the Persian Gulf on three occasions.

Anzac was deployed to the Persian Gulf for the third time from February until May 2003, as part of Operation Falconer. On 21 March 2003, Anzac provided naval gunfire support during the Battle of Al Faw. The intent of the assault was to capture the Al Faw Peninsula before Iraqi forces could sabotage the two major oil terminals in the area. The frigate began her first fire support mission at 06:04 on 21 March (the first time a RAN ship had fired in anger in 31 years) and completed seven fire missions over a three-day period. The frigate received the Meritorious Unit Citation on 27 November 2003 for her service during this deployment. In March 2010, Anzac was awarded the battle honours "Persian Gulf 2001–03" and "Iraq 2003".

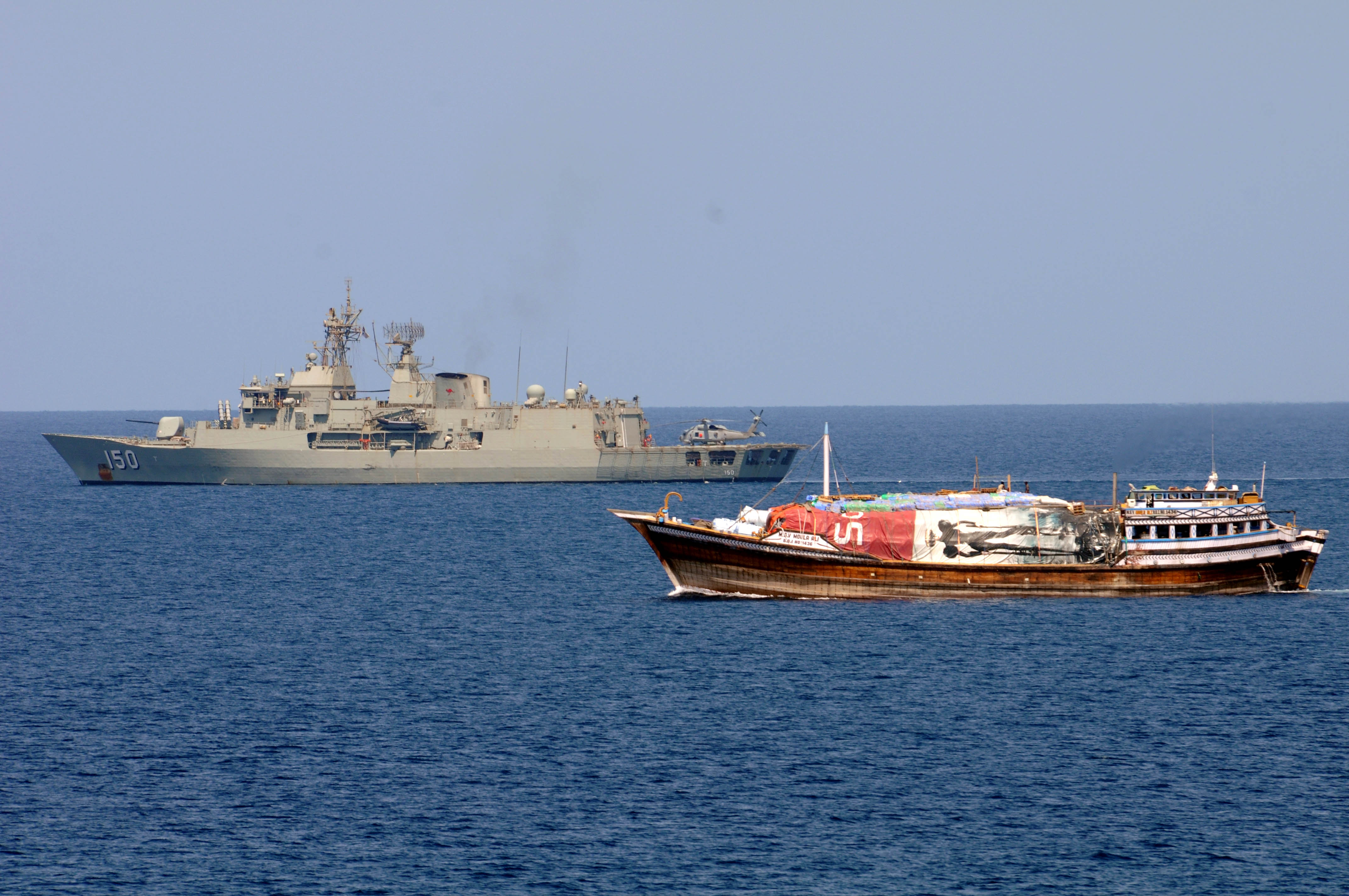
Anzac underway alongside a dhow in the Gulf of Aden

In 2005, Anzac participated in a Northern Trident deployment: a round-the-world voyage intended as a flag-showing cruise to the northern hemisphere. As part of this deployment, Anzac was involved in ceremonies for the 90th anniversary of the Gallipoli landings, and participated in the fleet review for the bicentenary of the Battle of Trafalgar.

On the morning of 13 March 2009, Anzac was one of seventeen warships involved in a ceremonial fleet entry and fleet review in Sydney Harbour, the largest collection of RAN ships since the Australian Bicentenary in 1988. The frigate was one of the thirteen ships involved in the ceremonial entry through Sydney Heads, and anchored in the harbour for the review.

Anzac was assigned to Rotation 29 of Operation Slipper from July 2012 to January 2013 as part of the International Coalition Against Terrorism (ICAT), and which included counter-piracy in the Arabian Sea region and elsewhere.

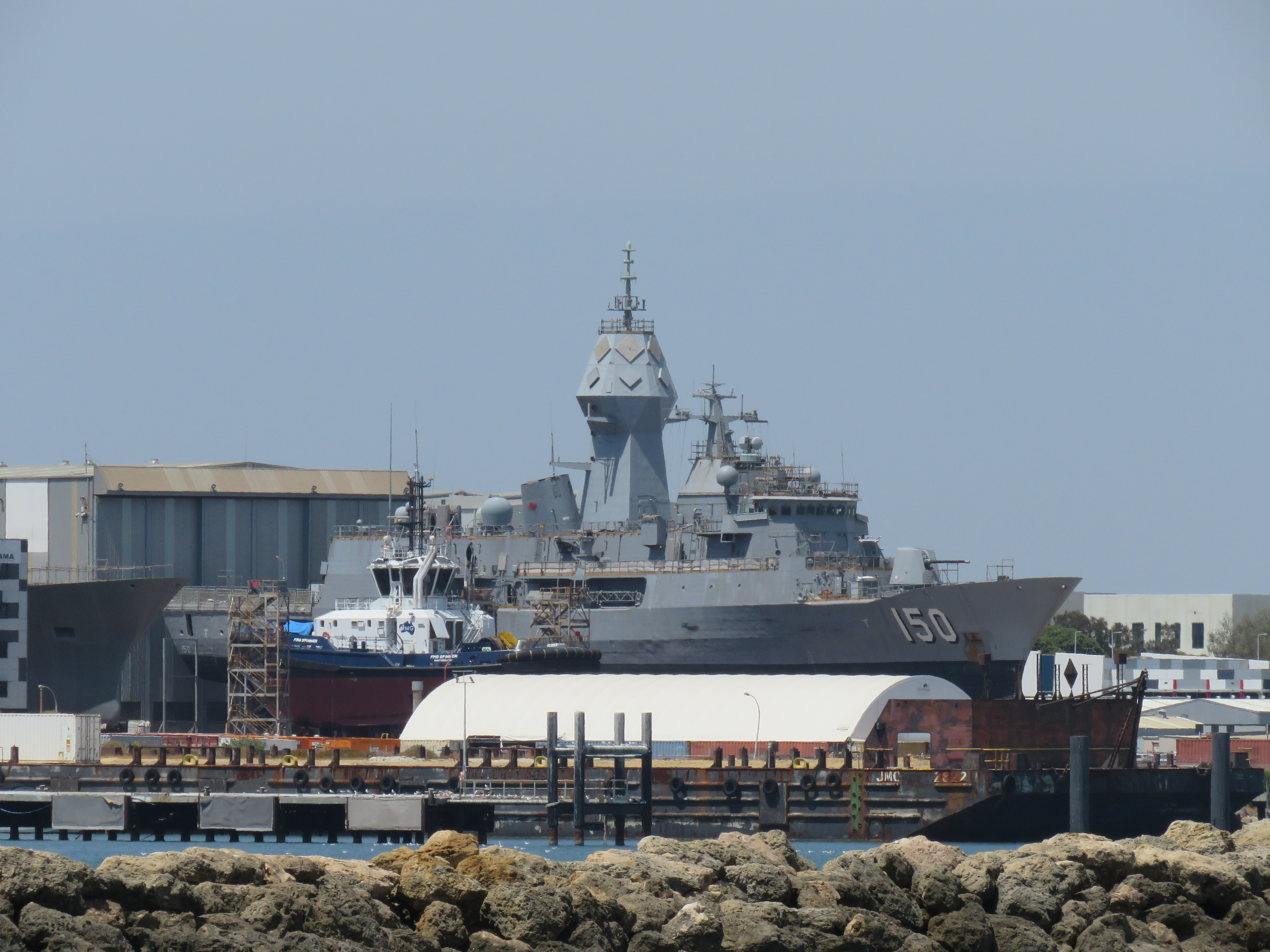
HMAS Anzac at the Australian Marine Complex in February 2024

During 2014, Anzac was the third ship of the class to undergo the Anti-Ship Missile Defence (ASMD) upgrade. The upgrade occurred across 2014 and early 2015, the upgrade included the fitting of CEA Technologies' CEAFAR and CEAMOUNT phased array radars, on new masts, a Vampir NG Infrared Search and Track system, and Sharpeye Navigational Radar Systems, along with improvements to the operations room equipment and layout.

Between March and October 2015, Anzac sailed on a second Northern Trident deployment. The 27,000-nautical-mile (50,000 km; 31,000 mi) circumnavigation included port visits to 11 countries and participation in commemorative services for the Gallipoli and Normandy landings.

Anzac has received freedom of entry to the city of Albany, Western Australia: Albany was the port the first convoy of the ANZACs departed Australia from.

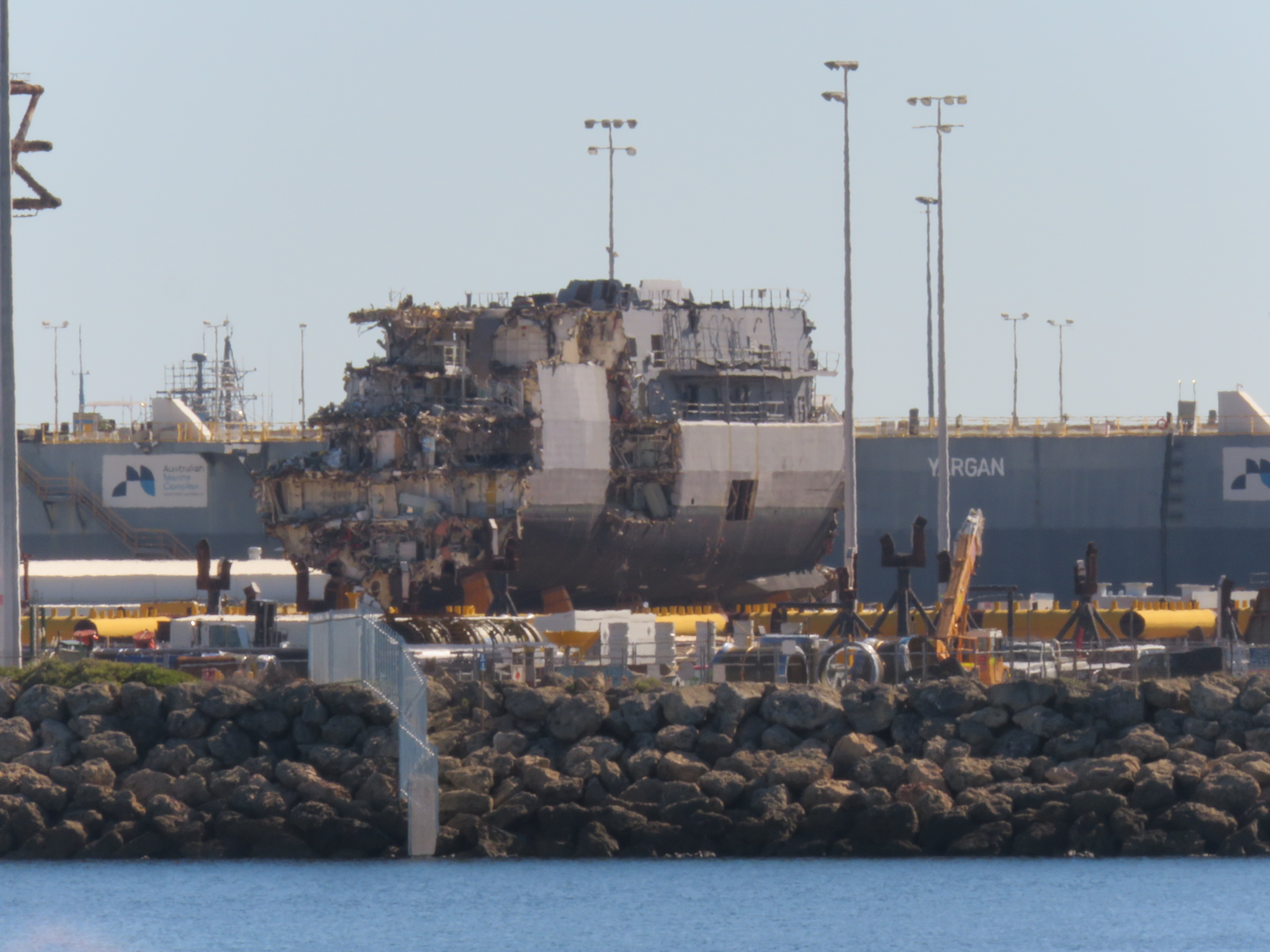
A partially dismantled HMAS Anzac at Henderson, Western Australia, in May 2026

In February 2024 it was announced that Anzac was due to decommission in 2024, the first of her class, to free up funding for a future enlargement of the RAN. Her sister ship, Arunta, was scheduled to be decommissioned in 2026 while the remainder of the class would not receive any more major upgrades. On 18 May 2024, a decommissioning ceremony was held for Anzac at HMAS Stirling. HMAS Anzac was scrapped in 2025.
