= HMS Sarpedon (1916) =

Destroyer of the Royal Navy

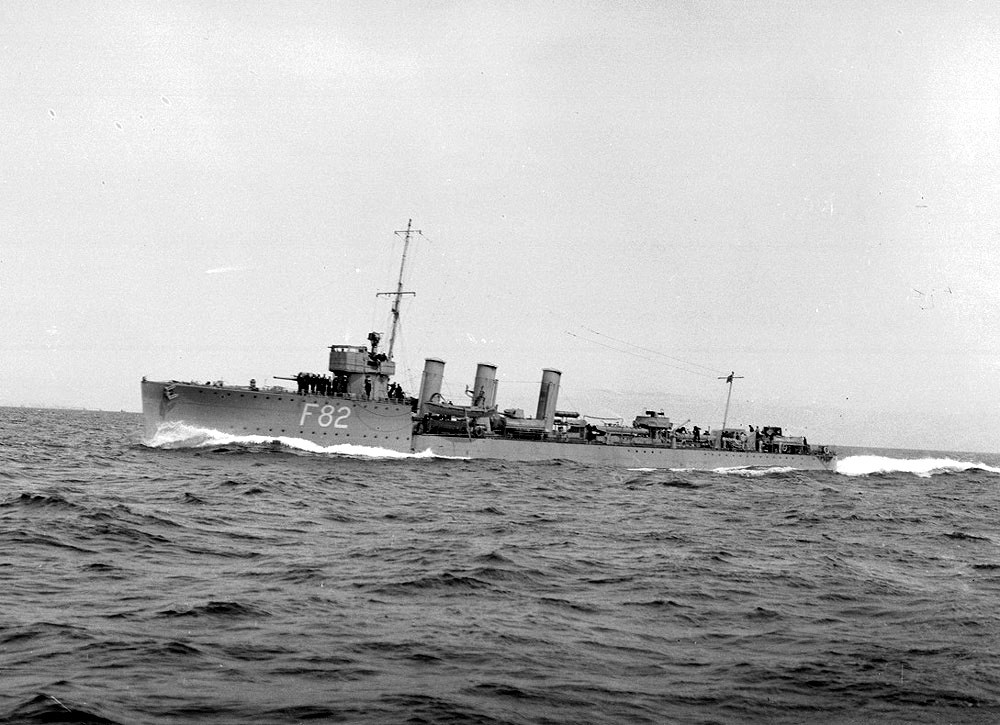
- Sister ship HMS Thisbe at sea in 1917

History

United Kingdom
- Name: HMS Sarpedon
- Namesake: Sarpedon
- Builder: Hawthorn Leslie and Company, Hebburn
- Laid down: 27 September 1915
- Launched: 1 June 1916
- Commissioned: 2 September 1916
- Out of service: 23 July 1926
- Fate: Sold to be broken up

General characteristics
- Class & type: R-class destroyer
- Displacement: 975 long tons (991 t) standard 1,035 long tons (1,052 t) full
- Length: 265 ft (80.8 m)
- Beam: 26 ft 7 in (8.1 m)
- Draught: 9 ft 8 in (2.95 m)
- Propulsion: 3 Yarrow boilers; 2 geared Parsons steam turbines, 27,000 shp (20,000 kW)
- Speed: 36 knots (41.4 mph; 66.7 km/h)
- Range: 3,440 nmi (6,370 km) at 15 kn (28 km/h)
- Complement: 82
- Armament: 3 × QF 4-inch (101.6 mm) Mark IV guns, mounting P Mk. IX; 1 × single 2-pounder (40-mm) "pom-pom" Mk. II anti-aircraft gun; 4 × 21 in (533 mm) torpedo tubes (2×2)

HMS Sarpedon was an R-class destroyer which served with the Royal Navy. The R class were a development of the preceding M-class, but differed in having geared turbines and other design changes. Launched in June 1916, the vessel escorted convoys that sailed between Scotland and Scandinavia in the First World War. After the war, the ship was allocated to local defence at Nore. However, in 1923, the Navy decided to retire many of the older vessels and Sarpedon was retired and was sold to be broken up on 23 June 1926.

== Design and development ==
Sarpedon was one of eighteen R-class destroyers ordered by the British Admiralty in March 1916 as part of the Sixth War Construction Programme. The R class were a development of the preceding M-class, but differed in having geared turbines to improve fuel consumption, the central gun mounted on a bandstand and minor changes to improve seakeeping.

The ship was 265 feet (80.77 m) long overall, with a beam of 26 feet 9 inches (8.15 m) and a draught of 9 feet 8 inches (2.95 m). Displacement was 975 long tons (991 t) normal and 1,035 long tons (1,052 t) deep load. Power was provided by three Yarrow boilers feeding two Parsons geared steam turbines rated at 27,000 shaft horsepower (20,000 kW) and driving two shafts, to give a design speed of 36 knots (67 km/h; 41 mph). Three funnels were fitted. A total of 296 long tons (301 t) of fuel oil was carried, giving a design range of 3,450 nautical miles (6,390 km; 3,970 mi) at 15 knots (28 km/h; 17 mph).

Armament consisted of three QF 4in Mk IV guns on the ship's centreline, with one on the forecastle, one aft on a raised platform and one between the second and third funnels. A single 2-pounder (40 mm) pom-pom anti-aircraft gun was carried, while torpedo armament consisted of two twin mounts for 21 in (533 mm) torpedoes. The ship had a complement of 82 officers and ratings.

== Construction and career ==
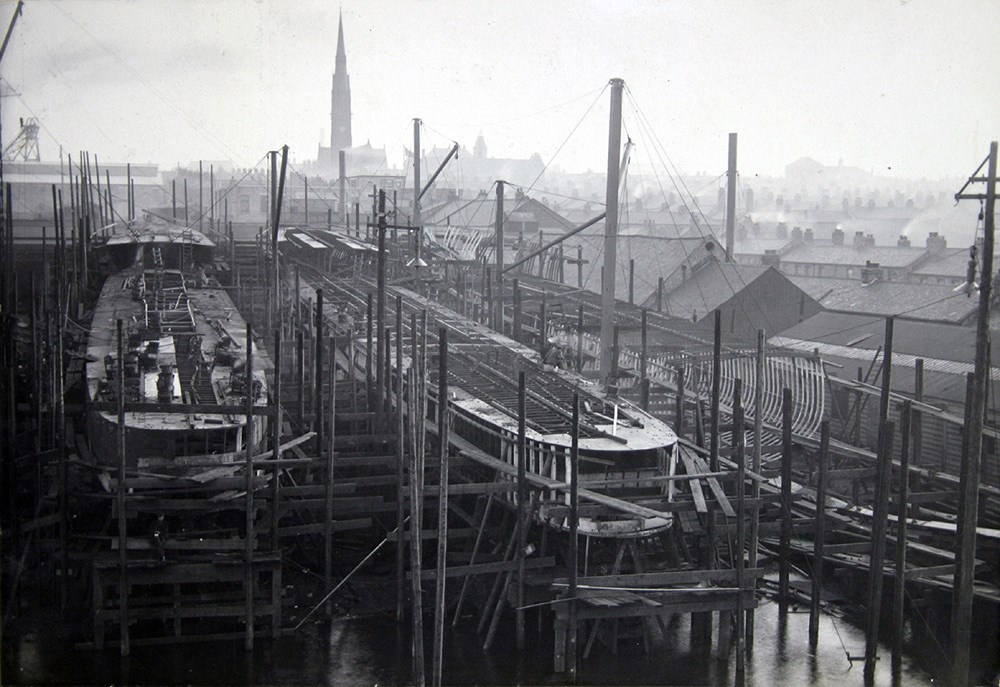
Sarpedon under construction alongside Pigeon and Plover

Sarpedon was laid down by Hawthorn Leslie and Company in Hebburn on 27 September 1915, launched on 1 June 1916 and completed on 2 September. On commissioning, the ship joined the 11th Destroyer Flotilla of the Grand Fleet.

The destroyer was assigned to escort convoys between Britain and Scandinavia. On 19 July 1917, Sarpedon and the destroyer Arab were escorting an east-bound convoy on the route from Lerwick to Norway when they came under attack by the German submarine U-67. The Danish steamer Harrildsborg was sunk and the submarine escaped unseen and unscathed. Later that year, on 21 October, the destroyer was escorting a west-bound convoy from Bergen, when sister ship Tirade fatally crippled fellow escort Marmion in an accidental collision.

After the war, the ship was allocated to the local defence flotilla at Nore. in 1923, the Navy decided to scrap many of the older destroyers in preparation for the introduction of newer and larger vessels. Sarpedon was decommissioned and sold to Alloa Shipbreaking Company to be scrapped on 23 July 1926. Initially taken to Rosyth to be demolished on 6 November, the hulk was transferred to Charlestown to be broken up on 7 December.

== Pennant numbers ==
Pennant number	Date
G19	January 1917
G21	April 1918
G14	September 1918
G82	January 1919
F15	November 1919
