= HMS Seymour (1916) =

Destroyer of the Royal Navy

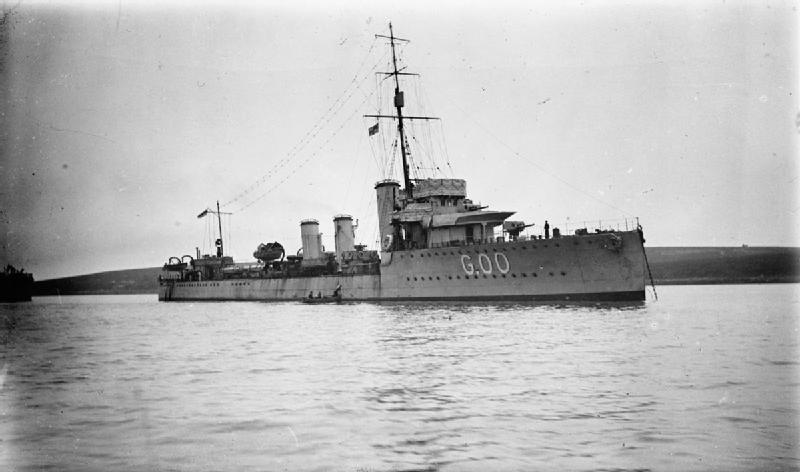

History

United Kingdom
- Ordered: July 1915
- Builder: Cammell Laird, Birkenhead
- Laid down: 23 November 1915
- Launched: 31 August 1916
- Commissioned: 30 November 1916
- Fate: Sold for scrap 7 January 1930

General characteristics
- Class & type: Parker-class leader
- Displacement: 1,660–1,673 long tons (1,687–1,700 t)
- Length: 325 ft (99.1 m) oa; 315 ft (96.0 m) pp
- Beam: 31 ft 9 in (9.7 m)
- Draught: 12 ft (3.7 m) maximum
- Propulsion: 4 × Yarrow boilers, Parsons turbines, 3 shafts; 36,000 shaft horsepower (27,000 kW)
- Speed: 34 kn (63 km/h; 39 mph)
- Range: 4,920 nautical miles (9,110 km; 5,660 mi) at 15 knots (28 km/h; 17 mph)
- Complement: 116
- Armament: 4 × single QF 4-inch Mark IV guns; 2 × 2-pounder "pom-pom" guns; 2 × twin 21 inch (533 mm) torpedo tube sets; 2 × depth charge chutes

HMS Seymour was a Parker-class flotilla leader of the British Royal Navy. She was built by Cammell Laird during the First World War, being launched on 31 August 1916 and completing on 30 November that year. Seymour served with the Grand Fleet for the rest of the war, which she survived. The ship was sold for scrap in January 1931.

== Construction and design ==
In July 1915, the British Admiralty ordered three Parker-class flotilla leaders (i.e. large destroyers intended to lead flotillas of smaller destroyers in action) under the Sixth Emergency War Construction Programme, Seymour, Hoste and Saumarez, from the Birkenhead shipyard Cammell Laird. The Parker-class (Note: Also known as the improved Marksman-class) was an improved version of the earlier Marksman-class flotilla leader with the forward two funnels of the Marksman-class merged into one and the ships' bridge moved rearwards, allowing an improved gun layout.

The Parkers were 325 feet (99.1 m) long overall and 315 feet (96.0 m) between perpendiculars, with a beam of 31 feet 9 inches (9.7 m) and a draught of 12 feet (3.7 m). Displacement was between 1,660 long tons (1,687 t) and 1,673 long tons (1,700 t) normal (Note: Jane's Fighting Ships of World War I gives a normal displacement of 1,673 long tons (1,700 t) in 1919.) and about 1,900 long tons (1,930 t) full load. Four Yarrow boilers fed steam to three sets of Parsons steam turbines, rated at 36,000 shaft horsepower (27,000 kW) and giving a speed of 34 knots (63 km/h; 39 mph). Three funnels were fitted. 515 long tons (523 t) of oil fuel were carried, giving a range of 4,290 nautical miles (7,950 km; 4,940 mi) at 15 knots (28 km/h; 17 mph).

The ship's main gun armament consisted of four QF 4-inch (102 mm) Mk IV guns mounted on the ships centreline, with the forward two guns superfiring so that one could fire over the other, with one gun between the second and third funnel and one aft. Two 2-pounder (40 mm) "pom-pom" anti-aircraft guns were fitted, while torpedo armament consisted of two sets of twin 21 inch (533 mm) torpedo tubes. The standard anti-submarine armament for flotilla leaders such as Seymour from June 1916 onwards was two Type D depth charges on chutes, although the number of depth charges tended to increased as the war progressed and the importance of anti-submarine operations grew. The ship's complement was 116 officers and men.

Seymour, probably named for the Elizabethan Admiral Lord Henry Seymour, who took part in the defeat of the Spanish Armada in 1588, (Note: The second HMS Seymour, a Second World War frigate, was named after a different historical naval commander, Lord Hugh Seymour.), was laid down on 23 November 1915, launched on 31 August 1916 and completed on 30 November that year. (Note: English has Seymour being laid down on 23 December 1915 and commissioning on 30 December 1916.) In 1917, Seymour was fitted to allow her to be used for minelaying, with the ability to carry 80 mines, (Note: 40 mines according to Friedman.) although this capacity appears not to have been used in action.

== Service ==
Following completion, Seymour joined the 11th Destroyer Flotilla of the Grand Fleet at Scapa Flow on 4 December 1916, serving as leader of the Flotilla, (Note: Seymour was listed as "Flotilla Cruiser", serving as the Captain (D)'s flagship.) with Kempenfelt serving as a second leader. In July 1917, the flotilla, including Seymour, moved to Rosyth. From 15 June 1917 the destroyers and submarines of the Grand Fleet took part in Operation BB, a large scale operation against German submarines, with 53 destroyers and leaders together with 17 submarines deployed on offensive patrols on the transit route for the Germans from the North Sea and around the Orkney and Shetland Islands to the Western Approaches. Seymour led destroyers of the 11th and 13th Flotillas on patrol to the east of Orkney. The flotilla's patrol area saw little activity, although two destroyers (Narborough and Oriana) were diverted to unsuccessfully search for a submarine that had reportedly been attacked by the British submarine J1. Overall, 61 sightings were made of German submarines were made by the destroyers and submarines of the Grand Fleet until the operation ended on 24 June, of which 12 resulted in attacks on the submarines, but no submarines were sunk or damaged. In October 1917, the Grand Fleet carried out another large-scale anti-submarine operation, in which destroyers and submarines were to be used to drive German U-boats that were returning to port from operations and passing to the east of the Dogger Bank into a large (several miles long) array of mine nets. Seymour took part in this operation, leading 10 destroyers in patrolling east of the Moray Firth and Firth of Forth. The operation lasted for 10 days, and British Intelligence believed that three U-boats were probably sunk in the operation. However, the submarines in question were almost certainly lost in other mine-fields.

Seymour remained part of the Grand Fleet until the end of the war. On 21 November 1918, Seymour helped to escort the German High Seas Fleet to the Firth of Forth prior to its internment at Scapa Flow, and while photographing the German ships, rescued the crew of an aircraft that crashed in the vicinity and salvaged the aircraft. In December 1919, Seymour transferred to the 21st Destroyer Flotilla, still based at Rosyth, where it served through to February. March saw the ship joining the newly reformed 4th Destroyer Flotilla, where she served until October 1919.

On 11 October 1919, Seymour arrived at Portsmouth and entered reserve. She was refitted at Pembroke Dock in June–July 1923, and in July 1924 was commissioned to take part in naval exercises before returning to reserve later that year.

== Disposal ==
Seymour was sold to John Cashmore Ltd on 7 January 1930 for £9,650 and was removed to their works at Newport for scrapping on 13 February that year.

== Pennant numbers ==
Pennant number	From	To
G00	March 1917	August 1917
G20	January 1918	April 1918
G00	April 1918	November 1918
D09	November 1918	October 1919
F19	November 1919	1922
H15	1922	1930
