= HMS Saumarez (1916) =

Destroyer of the Royal Navy

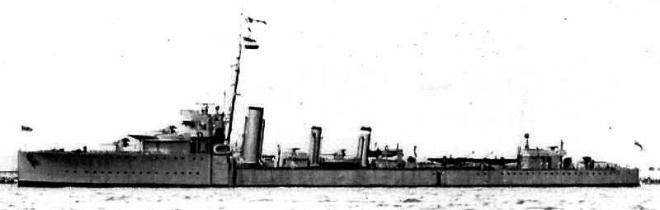
- HMS Saumarez

History

United Kingdom
- Ordered: July 1915
- Builder: Cammell Laird, Birkenhead
- Laid down: 2 March 1916
- Launched: 14 October 1916
- Commissioned: 21 December 1916
- Fate: Sold for scrap 8 January 1931

General characteristics
- Class & type: Parker-class flotilla leader
- Displacement: 1,660–1,673 long tons (1,687–1,700 t)
- Length: 325 ft (99.1 m) oa; 315 ft (96.0 m) pp
- Beam: 31 ft 9 in (9.7 m)
- Draught: 12 ft (3.7 m) maximum
- Propulsion: 4 × Yarrow boilers, Parsons turbines, 3 shafts; 36,000 shaft horsepower (27,000 kW)
- Speed: 34 kn (63 km/h; 39 mph)
- Range: 4,920 nautical miles (9,110 km; 5,660 mi) at 15 knots (28 km/h; 17 mph)
- Complement: 116
- Armament: 4 × single QF 4-inch Mark IV guns; 2 × 2-pounder "pom-pom" guns; 2 × twin 21 inch (533 mm) torpedo tube sets; 2 × depth charge chutes

HMS Saumarez was a Parker-class flotilla leader of the British Royal Navy. She was built by Cammell Laird during the First World War, being launched on 14 October 1916 and completing on 21 December that year. Saumarez served with the Grand Fleet for the rest of the war, which she survived. The ship was sold for scrap in January 1931.

== Construction and design ==
In July 1915, the British Admiralty ordered three Parker-class flotilla leaders (i.e. large destroyers intended to lead flotillas of smaller destroyers in action) under the Sixth Emergency War Construction Programme, Saumarez, Hoste and Seymour, from the Birkenhead shipyard Cammell Laird. The Parker class (Note: Also known as the improved Marksman class) was an improved version of the earlier Marksman-class flotilla leader with the forward two funnels of the Marksman class merged into one and the ships' bridge moved rearwards, allowing an improved gun layout.

The Parkers were 325 feet (99.1 m) long overall and 315 feet (96.0 m) between perpendiculars, with a beam of 31 feet 9 inches (9.7 m) and a draught of 12 feet (3.7 m). Displacement was between 1,660 long tons (1,687 t) and 1,673 long tons (1,700 t) normal (Note: Jane's Fighting Ships of World War I gives a normal displacement of 1,673 long tons (1,700 t) in 1919.) and about 1,900 long tons (1,930 t) full load. Four Yarrow boilers fed steam to three sets of Parsons steam turbines, rated at 36,000 shaft horsepower (27,000 kW) and giving a speed of 34 knots (63 km/h; 39 mph). Three funnels were fitted. 515 long tons (523 t) of oil fuel were carried, giving a range of 4,290 nautical miles (7,950 km; 4,940 mi) at 15 knots (28 km/h; 17 mph).

The ship's main gun armament consisted of four QF 4-inch (102 mm) Mk IV guns mounted on the ships centreline, with the forward two guns superfiring so that one could fire over the other, with one gun between the second and third funnel and one aft. Two 2-pounder (40 mm) "pom-pom" anti-aircraft guns were fitted, while torpedo armament consisted of two sets of twin 21 inch (533 mm) torpedo tubes. The standard anti-submarine armament for flotilla leaders such as Saumarez from June 1916 onwards was two Type D depth charges on chutes, although the number of depth charges tended to increased as the war progressed and the importance of anti-submarine operations grew. The ship's complement was 116 officers and men.

Saumarez, named after James Saumarez, 1st Baron de Saumarez, was laid down on 2 March 1916, and was launched on 14 October 1916, (Note: 14 November 1916 according to English.) and commissioned on 21 December 1916.

== Service ==
On commissioning, Saumarez joined the 12th Destroyer Flotilla as leader and flagship of the flotilla's Captain (D). On 17 May 1917, the German submarine UC-31 attacked and torpedoed two Swedish merchant ships east of the Orkney Islands, Viken and Aspen, (Note: The two ships had just been released by British authorities after being detained at Kirkwall.) sinking Viken with the loss of eight of her crew, and causing Aspen's crew to abandon ship. Saumarez sighted some of Aspen's boats, and ordered the destroyer Michael to investigate. Michael picked up the survivors, and found that Aspen was still afloat. Michael, with the aid of a tug, brought Aspen to safety in Kirkwall, with Saumarez escorting the two ships into harbour. In July 1917, the flotilla, including Saumarez, moved to Rosyth. From 15 June 1917 the destroyers and submarines of the Grand Fleet took part in Operation BB, a large scale operation against German submarines, with 53 destroyers and leaders together with 17 submarines deployed on offensive patrols on the transit route for the Germans from the North Sea and around the Orkney and Shetland Islands to the Western Approaches. Saumarez led nine to ten destroyers of the 12th Flotilla on patrol to the west of the Hebrides. Two sightings of submarines and one unsuccessful attack on a submarine was carried out in Saumarez's area, while one unescorted merchant ship was sunk by a German submarine in the area. Overall, 61 sightings were made of German submarines were made by the destroyers and submarines of the Grand Fleet until the operation ended on 24 June, of which 12 resulted in attacks on the submarines, but no submarines were sunk or damaged.

On 17 November 1917, the Grand Fleet launched a major sortie on German forces in the North Sea - a force of cruisers and destroyers, supported by battlecruisers, and with a squadron of battleships in distant support, was to attack German minesweepers in the Heligoland Bight. Saumarez formed part of the escort for the covering force of the battleships of the 1st Battle Squadron, sailing a few hours behind the main force. The operation resulted in the inconclusive Second Battle of Heligoland Bight.

Saumarez remained leader of the 12th Flotilla until the end of the war. The Grand Fleet was broken up after the end of the war, with new destroyer flotillas formed, and in February, Saumarez was listed as being based at HMNB Devonport, but not as part of a flotilla. By March, she was leader of the 5th Destroyer Flotilla, but she was reduced to reserve at Devonport on 15 October 1919. Saumarez remained in reserve most of the rest of her career apart from brief commissionings to take part in exercises, serving as a tender to the training school at Keyham. Saumarez was sold to the shipbreakers Thos. W. Ward on 8 January 1931 for £5,100 and was removed to their works at Briton Ferry for scrapping on 2 February that year.

== Pennant numbers ==
Pennant number	From	To
G3A	December 1916	March 1917
G25	March 1917	September 1917
G45	January 1918	April 1918
G25	April 1918	October 1919
F00	November 1919	1922
H08	1922	1930
