= Parker-class flotilla leader =

1916 British warship

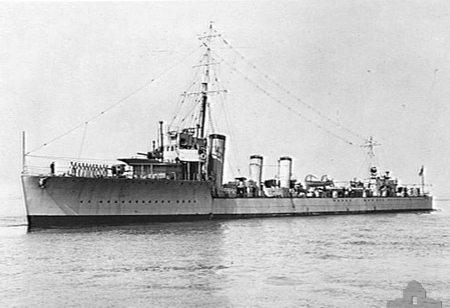
- HMAS Anzac

Class overview
- Name: Parker class
- Builders: Cammell Laird; William Denny and Brothers
- Operators: Royal Navy; Royal Australian Navy
- Preceded by: Marksman class
- Succeeded by: Admiralty V class
- Built: 1915–1917
- In commission: 1915–1935
- Completed: 6
- Lost: 1
- Retired: 5

General characteristics
- Type: Destroyer flotilla leader
- Displacement: 1,670 long tons (1,700 t)
- Length: 325 ft (99 m)
- Beam: 31 ft 9 in (9.68 m)
- Draught: 10 ft 6 in (3.20 m)
- Propulsion: Yarrow-type boilers, steam turbines, 3 shafts, 36,000 shp
- Speed: 34 knots (63 km/h; 39 mph)
- Endurance: 415 tons oil
- Complement: 116
- Armament: 4 × QF 4-inch (101.6 mm) Mark IV guns, mounting P Mk. IX; 1 × 12-pdr (3 in) QF Mark II, mounting HA Mk.?; 2 × single 2-pdr "pom-pom" Mk. II; 2 × twin 21-inch (530 mm) torpedo tubes

The Parker-class leaders or improved Marksman-class leaders were a class of six destroyer leaders built for the Royal Navy during 1916–17 for World War I service. They were named after famed historical naval leaders, except for Anzac, which was named to honour the Australian and New Zealand Army Corps, and was later transferred to the Royal Australian Navy. They were the last major Royal Navy warships to be ordered with three propeller shafts, a design that was never widely adopted in British warships.

== Design ==
The Parkers were based on the design of the preceding Marksman-class leaders and shared the same hull design and dimensions. Operations with the Marksman class and previous leaders indicated several areas for improvement: more freeboard, increased firepower, and relocation of the bridge to a position further aft. On the Parker class, the bridge was moved aft by reducing the boiler rooms from three to two; instead of the four funnels on the Marksmans, the Parkers had three, with the foremost funnel thicker and taller to keep the bridge clear of smoke. This allowed a superfiring gun to be added on a shelter deck. This crucial design change was to set the trend for future designs, as it allowed for two forward guns with unobstructed firing arcs, with the higher of the two guns still usable when heavy seas broke across the fo'c'sle. Anzac was the only ship of the class with increased freeboard, as the decision to do so was made after the construction began on the other ships.

Another design improvement over previous types was the adoption of the Royal Navy's new director firing system for destroyers and leaders, a more spartan version of that on its battleships. Rather than having individual gun crews lay and fire their guns independently, the director on the bridge indicated the elevation and training for all the guns, and a gyroscope within the director fired them simultaneously "on the roll". This system improved accuracy, and was adopted as standard from the "V and W" destroyer class of 1917 onwards.

== Ships ==
The first pair were ordered under the War Emergency Programme in February 1915; the first vessel was initially named Frobisher, but was renamed Parker before launch:

- Parker,

built by Cammell Laird and Company, Birkenhead, laid down 19 June 1915, launched 19 April 1916, and completed 13 November 1916. Sold for breaking up 5 November 1921.

- Grenville, after Richard Grenville

built by Cammell Laird, laid down 19 June 1915, launched 16 June 1916 and completed 11 October 1916. Sold for breaking up December 1931.

The next three ships were ordered in July 1915, and the last – Anzac – in December 1915:

- Hoste, after William Hoste

built by Cammell Laird, laid down 1 July 1915, launched 16 August 1916 and completed November 1916. Lost following a collision with destroyer Negro 21 December 1916 off the Shetland Islands.

- Seymour,

built by Cammell Laird, laid down 23 November 1915, launched 31 August 1916 and completed 30 November 1916. Converted to minelayer after completion. Sold for breaking up 7 January 1930.

- Saumarez, after James Saumarez, 1st Baron de Saumarez

built by Cammell Laird, laid down 2 March 1916, launched 14 November 1916 and completed 21 December 1916. Sold for breaking up 8 January 1931.

- Anzac,

built by William Denny and Brothers, Dumbarton, laid down 31 January 1916, launched 11 January 1917 and completed 24 April 1917. Transferred to the Royal Australian Navy in March 1919, and sold for breaking up 8 August 1935.

== Bibliography ==
- Colledge, J. J.; Warlow, Ben (2006) [1969]. Ships of the Royal Navy: The Complete Record of All Fighting Ships of the Royal Navy from the 15th Century to the Present (3rd Rev ed.). London: Chatham Publishing. ISBN 978-1-86176-281-8. OCLC 67375475.
- Friedman, Norman (2009). British Destroyers: From Earliest Days to the Second World War. Barnsley, UK: Seaforth Publishing. ISBN 978-1-84832-049-9.
- Gardiner, Robert & Gray, Randal, eds. (1985). Conway's All The World's Fighting Ships 1906–1921. London: Conway Maritime Press. ISBN 0-85177-245-5.
- March, Edgar J. (1966). British Destroyers: A History of Development, 1892–1953; Drawn by Admiralty Permission From Official Records & Returns, Ships' Covers & Building Plans. London: Seeley Service. OCLC 164893555.
