= SM UC-55 =

1916 German type UC II minelaying U-boat

History

German Empire
- Name: UC-55
- Ordered: 12 January 1916
- Builder: Kaiserliche Werft, Danzig
- Yard number: 37
- Laid down: 25 February 1916
- Launched: 2 August 1916
- Commissioned: 15 November 1916
- Fate: Sunk off Shetland Islands, 29 September 1917

General characteristics
- Class & type: Type UC II submarine
- Displacement: 415 t (408 long tons), surfaced; 498 t (490 long tons), submerged
- Length: 52.69 m (172 ft 10 in) o/a; 40.96 m (134 ft 5 in) pressure hull
- Beam: 5.22 m (17 ft 2 in) o/a; 3.65 m (12 ft) pressure hull
- Draught: 3.61 m (11 ft 10 in)
- Propulsion: 2 × propeller shafts; 2 × 6-cylinder, 4-stroke diesel engines, 580–600 PS (430–440 kW; 570–590 shp); 2 × electric motors, 620 PS (460 kW; 610 shp)
- Speed: 11.6 knots (21.5 km/h; 13.3 mph), surfaced; 7.3 knots (13.5 km/h; 8.4 mph), submerged
- Range: 8,660–9,450 nmi (16,040–17,500 km; 9,970–10,870 mi) at 7 knots (13 km/h; 8.1 mph) surfaced; 52 nmi (96 km; 60 mi) at 4 knots (7.4 km/h; 4.6 mph) submerged
- Test depth: 50 m (160 ft)
- Complement: 26
- Armament: 6 × 100 cm (39.4 in) mine tubes; 18 × UC 200 mines; 3 × 50 cm (19.7 in) torpedo tubes (2 bow/external; one stern); 7 × torpedoes; 1 × 8.8 cm (3.5 in) Uk L/30 deck gun
- Notes: 30-second diving time

Service record
- Part of: I Flotilla; 15 February – 29 September 1917
- Commanders: Kptlt. Karl Neureuther; 15 November 1916 – 11 May 1917; Oblt.z.S. Theodor Schultz; 12 May – 27 June 1917; Oblt.z.S. Horst Rühle von Lilienstern; 28 June – 29 September 1917
- Operations: 6 patrols
- Victories: 9 merchant ships sunk (12,988 GRT); 2 merchant ships damaged (5,740 GRT); 1 warship damaged (440 tons)

SM UC-55 (Note: "SM" stands for "Seiner Majestät" (English: His Majesty's) and combined with the U for Unterseeboot would be translated as His Majesty's Submarine.) was a German Type UC II minelaying submarine or U-boat in the German Imperial Navy (German: Kaiserliche Marine) during World War I. The U-boat was ordered on 12 January 1916, laid down on 25 February 1916, and was launched on 2 August 1916. She was commissioned into the German Imperial Navy on 15 November 1916 as SM UC-55.

== Design ==
A Type UC II submarine, UC-55 had a displacement of 415 tonnes (408 long tons) when at the surface and 498 tonnes (490 long tons) while submerged. She had a length overall of 50.52 m (165 ft 9 in), a beam of 5.22 m (17 ft 2 in), and a draught of 3.61 m (11 ft 10 in). The submarine was powered by two six-cylinder four-stroke diesel engines each producing 290–300 metric horsepower (210–220 kW; 290–300 shp) (a total of 580–600 metric horsepower (430–440 kW; 570–590 shp)), two electric motors producing 620 metric horsepower (460 kW; 610 shp), and two propeller shafts. She had a dive time of 48 seconds and was capable of operating at a depth of 50 metres (160 ft).

The submarine had a maximum surface speed of 11.6 knots (21.5 km/h; 13.3 mph) and a submerged speed of 7.3 knots (13.5 km/h; 8.4 mph). When submerged, she could operate for 52 nautical miles (96 km; 60 mi) at 4 knots (7.4 km/h; 4.6 mph); when surfaced, she could travel 8,660 to 9,450 nautical miles (16,040 to 17,500 km; 9,970 to 10,870 mi) at 7 knots (13 km/h; 8.1 mph). UC-55 was fitted with six 100 centimetres (39 in) mine tubes, eighteen UC 200 mines, three 50 centimetres (20 in) torpedo tubes (one on the stern and two on the bow), seven torpedoes, and one 8.8 cm (3.5 in) Uk L/30 deck gun. Her complement was twenty-six crew members.

== Service ==
In 6 patrols UC-55 was credited with sinking 9 ships, either by torpedo or by mines laid.

== Loss ==
UC-55 sailed from Heligoland on 25 September 1917 to lay mines in the Lerwick Channel, the southern approach to the port of Lerwick in the Shetland Islands. On 29 September, just as she started dropping her mines, she suffered a loss of trim which resulted in her diving beyond her rated maximum dive depth. This in turn resulted in the forward compartment flooding, the batteries failing, and chlorine gas developing. She was forced to surface to ventilate the boat, but when she surfaced, the rudder refused to answer the helm due to the lack of battery power. Her captain then gave orders to destroy secret documents and codebooks and set scuttling charges in the mine room and engine room. While the charges were being placed she was sighted by the armed trawler Moravia and the destroyers HMS Tirade and HMS Sylvia.

A 12-pdr shell from the Sylvia hit the submarine's conning tower, killing her commander, Horst Ruhle von Lilienstern, and a second shell hit the hull and she began to sink, after which two depth charges were dropped right beside the UC-55, resulting in the U-boat blowing up. The Moravia then closed with the wreck, fired two more shots into her, and dropped a final depth charge. Of the submarine's crew, 17 were taken prisoner, and 10 were killed.

=== Location ===
The wreck of UC-55 was discovered by side scan sonar lying on its keel on 3 July 1985, at a depth of 105 m (344 ft) at 60°3′13″N 0°57′57″W. The submarine's remains were noted to be approximately 5.60 m (18.4 ft) high and 50 m (160 ft) long.

On Friday 21 July 2023 the wreck was confirmed to be that of the UC-55 by the first divers to visit site.

== Summary of raiding history ==
Date	Name	Nationality	Tonnage (Note: Tonnages are in gross register tons)	Fate
9 March 1917	HMS Albacore	Royal Navy	440	Damaged
19 April 1917	Bethlehem	United Kingdom	379	Sunk
21 April 1917	Gerda	Norway	979	Sunk
28 May 1917	Asters	Norway	1,531	Sunk
29 May 1917	Clan Murray	United Kingdom	4,835	Sunk
30 May 1917	Fernley	United Kingdom	3,820	Damaged
4 June 1917	Clara	Norway	923	Sunk
8 July 1917	Spekulation	Sweden	291	Sunk
10 July 1917	Flamma	United Kingdom	1,920	Damaged
12 July 1917	Balzac	Norway	1,720	Sunk
13 July 1917	Lai	Norway	509	Sunk
19 August 1917	Rosario	United Kingdom	1,821	Sunk
