= HMS Hoste (1916) =

Destroyer of the Royal Navy

History

United Kingdom
- Namesake: William Hoste
- Ordered: July 1915
- Builder: Cammell Laird, Birkenhead
- Launched: 16 August 1916
- Commissioned: 13 November 1916
- Fate: Sank following collision 21 December 1916

General characteristics
- Class & type: Parker-class leader
- Displacement: 1,660–1,673 long tons (1,687–1,700 t)
- Length: 325 ft (99.1 m) oa; 315 ft (96.0 m) pp
- Beam: 31 ft 9 in (9.7 m)
- Draught: 12 ft (3.7 m) maximum
- Propulsion: 4 × Yarrow boilers, Parsons turbines, 3 shafts; 36,000 shaft horsepower (27,000 kW)
- Speed: 34 kn (63 km/h; 39 mph)
- Range: 4,920 nautical miles (9,110 km; 5,660 mi) at 15 knots (28 km/h; 17 mph)
- Complement: 116
- Armament: 4 × single QF 4-inch Mark IV guns; 2 × 2-pounder "pom-pom" guns; 2 × twin 21 inch (533 mm) torpedo tube sets; 2 × depth charge chutes

HMS Hoste was a Parker-class flotilla leader of the Royal Navy. She was built by Cammell Laird during the First World War, completing on 13 November 1916, but was lost in a collision with the destroyer Negro on 21 December that year.

== Construction and design ==
In July 1915, the British Admiralty ordered three Parker-class flotilla leaders (i.e. large destroyers intended to lead flotillas of smaller destroyers in action), Hoste, Seymour and Saumarez, from the Birkenhead shipyard Cammell Laird. The Parker-class (Note: Also known as the improved Marksman-class) was an improved version of the earlier Marksman-class flotilla leader with the ships' bridge moved rearwards, and an improved gun layout.

The Parkers were 325 feet (99.1 m) long overall and 315 feet (96.0 m) between perpendiculars, with a beam of 31 feet 9 inches (9.7 m) and a draught of 12 feet (3.7 m). Displacement was between 1,660 long tons (1,687 t) and 1,673 long tons (1,700 t) normal (Note: Jane's Fighting Ships of World War I gives a normal displacement of 1,666 long tons (1,693 t) for the first two ships of the class, Parker and Grenville and 1,673 long tons (1,700 t) for Seymour and Saumarez, ordered at the same time as Hoste.) and about 1,900 long tons (1,930 t) full load. Four Yarrow boilers fed steam to three sets of Parsons steam turbines, rated at 36,000 shaft horsepower (27,000 kW) and giving a speed of 34 knots (63 km/h; 39 mph). Three funnels were fitted. 515 long tons (523 t) of oil fuel were carried, giving a range of 4,290 nautical miles (7,950 km; 4,940 mi) at 15 knots (28 km/h; 17 mph).

The ship's main gun armament consisted of four QF 4-inch (102 mm) Mk IV guns mounted on the ships centreline, with the forward two guns superfiring so that one could fire over the other, with one gun between the second and third funnel and one aft. Two 2-pounder (40 mm) "pom-pom" anti-aircraft guns were fitted, while torpedo armament consisted of two sets of twin 21 inch (533 mm) torpedo tubes. The standard anti-submarine armament for flotilla leaders such as Hoste from June 1916 onwards was two Type D depth charges on chutes. This was not increased until after Hoste's loss. The ship's complement was 116 officers and men. (Note: Hoste was carrying a complement of 138 when she was lost.)

Hoste, named for William Hoste, was laid down on 1 July 1915, launched on 16 August 1916 and commissioned on 13 November 1916.

== Service ==
On commissioning, Hoste joined the Thirteenth Destroyer Flotilla, part of the Grand Fleet, with the pennant number G90. On 19 December 1916, the Grand Fleet left Scapa Flow to carry out exercises between Shetland and Norway. On the morning of 20 December, Hoste suffered a failure of her steering gear at high speed, almost colliding with several other ships, and was detached to return to Scapa with the destroyer Negro as escort. At about 01:30 hr on 21 December, in extremely poor weather, with gale-force winds and a heavy sea, Hoste's rudder jammed again, forcing the ship into a sudden turn to port. Negro, following about 400 yards (370 m) behind, collided with Hoste. The collision knocked two depth charges off Hoste's stern which exploded, badly damaging the rear end of Hoste and blowing in the bottom of Negro's hull, flooding her engine room. Negro sank quickly, and despite the efforts of the destroyer Marmion to rescue survivors, 51 officers and men of Negro's crew were killed. Marmion and Marvel attempted to tow the crippled Hoste back to Scapa, but after three hours, Hoste began to founder. Despite the severe conditions, Marvel went alongside Hoste to rescue the crew of the sinking ship, and when repeatedly forced apart by the heavy seas, repeated the manoeuvre another twelve time. While Marvel sustained damage to her forecastle from repeated impacts between the two ships, she managed to rescue all but four of Hoste's crew before Hoste finally sank. Eight officers and 126 men were rescued by Marvel.

== Wreck ==
In August 2023, the wrecks of Hoste and Negro were located and identified. Hoste is lying at a depth of 100 metres (330 ft) in two pieces, the stern section about 3 nautical miles (5.6 km) from the main wreck, in approximately 59°16’N 1°55’W, 16 nautical miles (30 km) south of Fair Isle.
