= HMS Marmion (1915) =

British M-Class destroyer, WW1

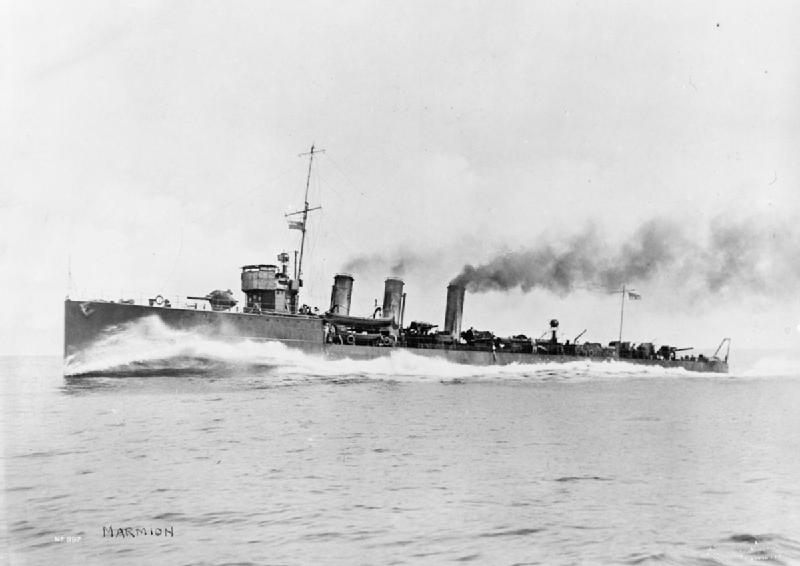
- HMS Marmion

History

United Kingdom
- Name: HMS Marmion
- Namesake: Marmion: A Tale of Flodden Field
- Ordered: September 1914
- Builder: Swan Hunter & Wigham Richardson, Wallsend
- Yard number: 977
- Laid down: 21 October 1914
- Launched: 28 May 1915
- Commissioned: 3 September 1915
- Out of service: 21 October 1917
- Fate: Sunk following collusion with Tirade

General characteristics
- Class & type: Admiralty M-class destroyer
- Displacement: 1,028 long tons (1,044 t) (normal); 1,250 long tons (1,270 t) (deep load)
- Length: 265 ft (80.8 m) (p.p.)
- Beam: 26 ft 7 in (8.1 m)
- Draught: 8 ft 7 in (2.6 m)
- Installed power: 3 Yarrow boilers, 25,000 shp (19,000 kW)
- Propulsion: Brown-Curtis steam turbines, 3 shafts
- Speed: 34 kn (39 mph; 63 km/h)
- Range: 2,280 nmi (4,220 km) at 17 kn (31 km/h)
- Complement: 77
- Armament: 3 × single QF 4-inch (102 mm) Mark IV guns; 1 × single 2-pdr 40 mm (1.6 in) AA gun; 2 × twin 21 in (533 mm) torpedo tubes

HMS Marmion was a Admiralty M-class destroyer which served with the Royal Navy during World War I. The M class were an improvement on the previous L class, capable of higher speed. Launched in May 1915, the ship served as part of the Grand Fleet on exercises and escort duty. For much of the war, it was commanded by William Leveson-Gower, the future uncle to Elizabeth II. While involved in convoy escort duty off the Shetland Islands on 21 October 1917, the vessel was accidentally struck by Tirade in bad weather and sank. There were no survivors.

== Design and development ==
Marmion was one of sixteen Admiralty M-class destroyer destroyers ordered by the British Admiralty in September 1914 as part of the First War Construction Programme. The M class was an improved version of the earlier L-class destroyers, required to reach a higher speed in order to counter rumoured German fast destroyers. The remit was to have a maximum speed of 36 knots (67 km/h; 41 mph) and, although the eventual design did not achieve this, the greater performance was appreciated by the navy. It transpired that the German ships did not exist.

The destroyer had a length of 265 feet (80.8 m) between perpendiculars and 273 feet 4 inches (83 m) overall, with a beam of 26 feet 7 inches (8.1 m) and a draught of 8 feet 7 inches (2.6 m) at deep load. Displacement was 1,028 long tons (1,044 t) normal and 1,250 long tons (1,270 t) deep load. Power was provided by three Yarrow boilers feeding Brown-Curtis steam turbines rated at 25,000 shaft horsepower (19,000 kW) and driving three shafts, to give a design speed of 34 kn (63 km/h; 39 mph). Two funnels were fitted, two boilers exhausting through the forward funnel. A total of 268 long tons (272 t) of oil could be carried, including 40 long tons (41 t) in peace tanks that were not used in wartime, giving a range of 2,280 nautical miles (4,220 km; 2,620 mi) at 17 knots (31 km/h; 20 mph).

Armament consisted of three single QF 4-inch (102 mm) Mk IV guns on the ship's centreline, with one on the forecastle, one aft on a raised platform and one between the middle and aft funnels. Torpedo armament consisted of two twin mounts for 21 in (533 mm) torpedoes. A single QF 2-pounder 40 mm (1.6 in) "pom-pom" anti-aircraft gun was mounted between the torpedo tubes. After February 1916 Marmion was equipped with two chutes for depth charges for anti-submarine warfare. The ship had a complement of 77 officers and ratings.

== Construction and career ==
Construction by Swan Hunter & Wigham Richardson was started when the ship's hull was laid down on 28 October 1914 at Wallsend with yard number 977. The ship was launched on 28 May the following year. Initially allocated the pennant number H.C2, the ship became G04 in January 1917.

Commissioned on 3 September 1915, Marmion joined the Eleventh Destroyer Flotilla of the Grand Fleet. Within a month, William Leveson-Gower, who would become uncle to the future Elizabeth II, was appointed as commander. He remained in charge of the vessel until 25 May 1917.

The vessel was initially deployed as part of the Grand Fleet. On 21 December 1916, while undertaking exercises, the flotilla leader Hoste collided with the destroyer Negro. Marmion quickly pulled alongside the stricken destroyer to tow it to safety but when it was only 225 ft (69 m) away, Negro sunk beneath the waves. Five officers and forty-five ratings lost their lives. The ship then took Hoste in tow, along with fellow M-class destroyer Marvel, but that vessel too had to be abandoned once the crew had been evacuated.

Marmion also undertook escort duties. On 14 April 1917, the destroyer formed part of the escort for RMS Olympic, which transported Arthur Balfour on a mission to the US to procure additional destroyers for the fleet. The mission encountered heavy seas that caused substantial damage, but was a success.

In October 1917, Marmion was one of eight destroyers that were escorting convoys between Shetland and Norway. On 20 October, the vessel was sent to escort an outbound convoy heading for Bergen to replace Obedient which was returning for repairs. Another convoy under escort was heading from Bergen at the same time, escorted by the destroyers Sarpedon and Tirade. At 1:30AM on 21 October, Marmion encountered this second convoy rather than the one it was expecting to see, which was at the time some miles north. The ships were passing when Tirade collided with Marmion. The bow of the former vessel was raised by a particularly high swell and sliced Marmion in half. The ship swiftly sank with all hands. Only ten bodies were recovered.
