= HMS Marvel =

British M-Class destroyer, WW1

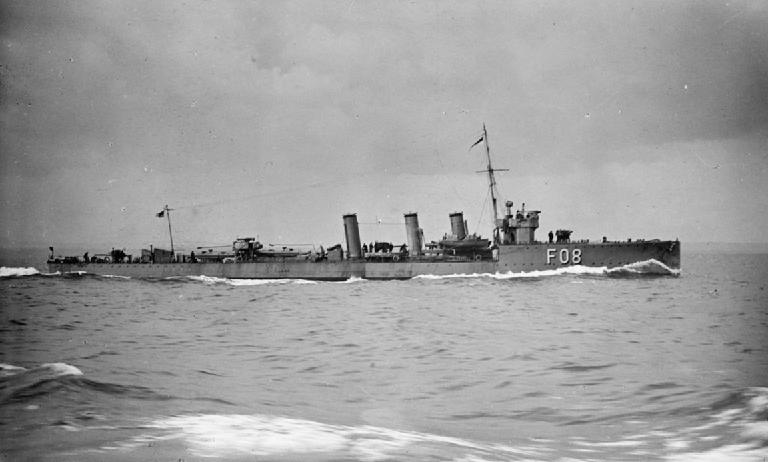
- Sister ship Oracle

History

United Kingdom
- Name: HMS Marvel
- Ordered: November 1914
- Builder: William Denny and Brothers, Dumbarton
- Yard number: 1031
- Laid down: 11 January 1915
- Launched: 7 October 1915
- Completed: 28 December 1915
- Out of service: 9 May 1921
- Fate: Sold to be broken up

General characteristics
- Class & type: Admiralty M-class destroyer
- Displacement: 994 long tons (1,010 t) (normal); 1,025 long tons (1,041 t) (deep load)
- Length: 265 ft (80.8 m)
- Beam: 26 ft 7 in (8.1 m)
- Draught: 8 ft 7 in (2.6 m)
- Installed power: 3 Yarrow boilers, 25,000 shp (19,000 kW)
- Propulsion: Parsons steam turbines, 3 shafts
- Speed: 34 knots (39.1 mph; 63.0 km/h)
- Range: 2,280 nmi (4,220 km) at 17 kn (31 km/h)
- Complement: 80
- Armament: 3 × single QF 4-inch (102 mm) Mark IV guns; 1 × single 2-pdr 40 mm (1.6 in) AA gun; 2 × twin 21 in (533 mm) torpedo tubes

HMS Marvel was a Admiralty M-class destroyer which served with the Royal Navy during the First World War. The M class were an improvement on the previous L class, capable of higher speed. The vessel, launched in October 1915, joined the Twelfth Destroyer Flotilla under the flotilla leader Faulknor. The ship saw action during the Battle of Jutland in May and June 1916, being hit by a 12 in (300 mm) shell that did not explode and jointly sinking the German torpedo boat SMS V48. Six months later, the vessel successfully rescued all but four of the crew of the sinking flotilla leader Hoste, despite sustaining substantial damage in the process. In June 1917, the vessel was involved in the sinking of the German merchant ship SS Gamma in Norwegian waters, which led to a diplomatic protest from the Norwegian government. At the end of the war, the vessel was placed in reserve until being sold to be broken up in May 1921.

== Design and development ==
Marvel was one of nine Admiralty M-class destroyers ordered by the British Admiralty in November 1914 as part of the Second War Construction Programme. The M class was an improved version of the earlier L-class destroyers, required to reach a higher speed in order to counter rumoured German fast destroyers. The remit was to have a maximum speed of 36 knots (67 km/h; 41 mph) and, although the eventual design did not achieve this, the greater performance was appreciated by the navy. It transpired that the German ships did not exist.

The destroyer had a length of 265 feet (80.8 m) between perpendiculars and 273 feet 4 inches (83.3 m) overall, with a beam of 26 feet 7 inches (8.1 m) and a draught of 8 feet 7 inches (2.6 m). Displacement was 994 long tons (1,010 t) normal and 1,025 long tons (1,041 t) full load. Power was provided by three Yarrow boilers feeding Parsons steam turbines rated at 25,000 shaft horsepower (19,000 kW) and driving three shafts, to give a design speed of 34 knots (63 km/h; 39 mph). Three funnels were fitted. A total of 268 long tons (272 t) of oil could be carried, including 40 long tons (41 t) in peace tanks that were not used in wartime, giving a range of 2,280 nautical miles (4,220 km; 2,620 mi) at 17 knots (31 km/h; 20 mph).

Armament consisted of three single QF 4-inch (102 mm) Mk IV guns on the ship's centreline, with one on the forecastle, one aft on a raised platform and one between the middle and aft funnels on a bandstand. Torpedo armament consisted of two twin mounts for 21 in (533 mm) torpedoes. A single QF 2-pounder 40 mm (1.6 in) "pom-pom" anti-aircraft gun was mounted between the torpedo tubes. After February 1916, for anti-submarine warfare, Marvel was equipped with two chutes for two depth charges. The number of depth charges carried increased as the war progressed. The ship had a complement of 80 officers and ratings.

== Construction and career ==
Marvel was laid down by William Denny and Brothers at Dumbarton on 11 January 1915 with the yard number 1031, launched on 7 October and completed on 28 December. This was the first time the name had been used in the Royal Navy. The vessel was deployed as part of the Grand Fleet, joining the Twelfth Destroyer Flotilla under the flotilla leader Faulknor.

On 30 May 1916, the destroyer sailed with the Grand Fleet to confront the German High Seas Fleet in what would be the Battle of Jutland, forming part of the First Division of the Flotilla that was led by Faulknor and included sister ships Mindful, Obedient and Onslaught. The division was deployed in action against the German light cruisers. However, in the battle melee, the division also got within the range of the main batteries of the battleships and battlecruisers which were at the centre of the action. At 6:29 PM, Marvel was hit by a stray 12 in (300 mm) shell, but it did not explode. Shortly afterwards, the division saw the approaching line of the German Third Torpedo Boat Flotilla and attacked. The destroyer, along with the rest of the flotilla, sank the torpedo boat V48, previously disabled by the destroyer Shark. As the battle closed, the Flotilla spotted the retreating German line. The First Division was ordered to attack, and, using their superior speed, the destroyers sped ahead of the German ships. At about 2:00 AM on 1 June, Marvel swung round and, finding a good position to target the battleships, launched four torpedoes. They all missed.

On 18 August, the destroyer was escorting the dreadnought battleship and flagship of the Grand Fleet Iron Duke along with sister ship Onslaught to intercept the High Seas Fleet on their attack on Sunderland. On 21 December, the destroyer was called to assist the flotilla leader Hoste, which had collided and sank Negro. Along with sister ship Marmion, Marvel attempted to tow the damaged ship back to Scapa Flow, but after three hours, Hoste began to founder. Disregarding the severe conditions, Marvel went alongside to rescue the crew of the sinking ship. Despite repeatedly being forced apart by the heavy seas and sustaining substantial damage to the forecastle, the destroyer returned twelve times and successfully rescued all but four of the ship's crew before the flotilla leader eventually sank.

On 2 June 1917, Marvel was involved in the sinking of the German steamship, SS Gamma. The destroyer was patrolling off the Norwegian coast along with the light cruiser Cambrian and sister ship Mindful when the merchantman was spotted. A warning shot was fired and Gamma turned to the Norwegian shore. The British vessels pursued and sank the ship. The Norwegian government protested the violation of their neutrality and presented the UK government with a bill of 3,406,124 marks, given to them by the German government, which the British government ignored. The cruise also led to protests from five other vessels, sailing under Norwegian and Swedish flags, four of which the Royal Navy admitted were stopped in neutral waters.

The harsh conditions of wartime operations, particularly the combination of high speed and the poor weather that is typical of the North Sea, exacerbated by the fact that the hull was not galvanised, meant that the destroyer was soon worn out. After the Armistice, the Royal Navy returned to a peacetime level of operation and it was decided that Marvel was to be withdrawn from active service. Initially, the destroyer was placed in reserve at Devonport. However, this did not last long as the navy needed to reduce both the number of ships and the amount of staff to save money. On 9 May 1921, the vessel was sold to Thos. W. Ward of Hayle and broken up.

== Pennant numbers ==
Pennant number	Date
G28	January 1918
GA3	September 1918
G21	January 1919
