= HMAS Anzac (G90) =

Parker-class destroyer of Royal Australian Navy

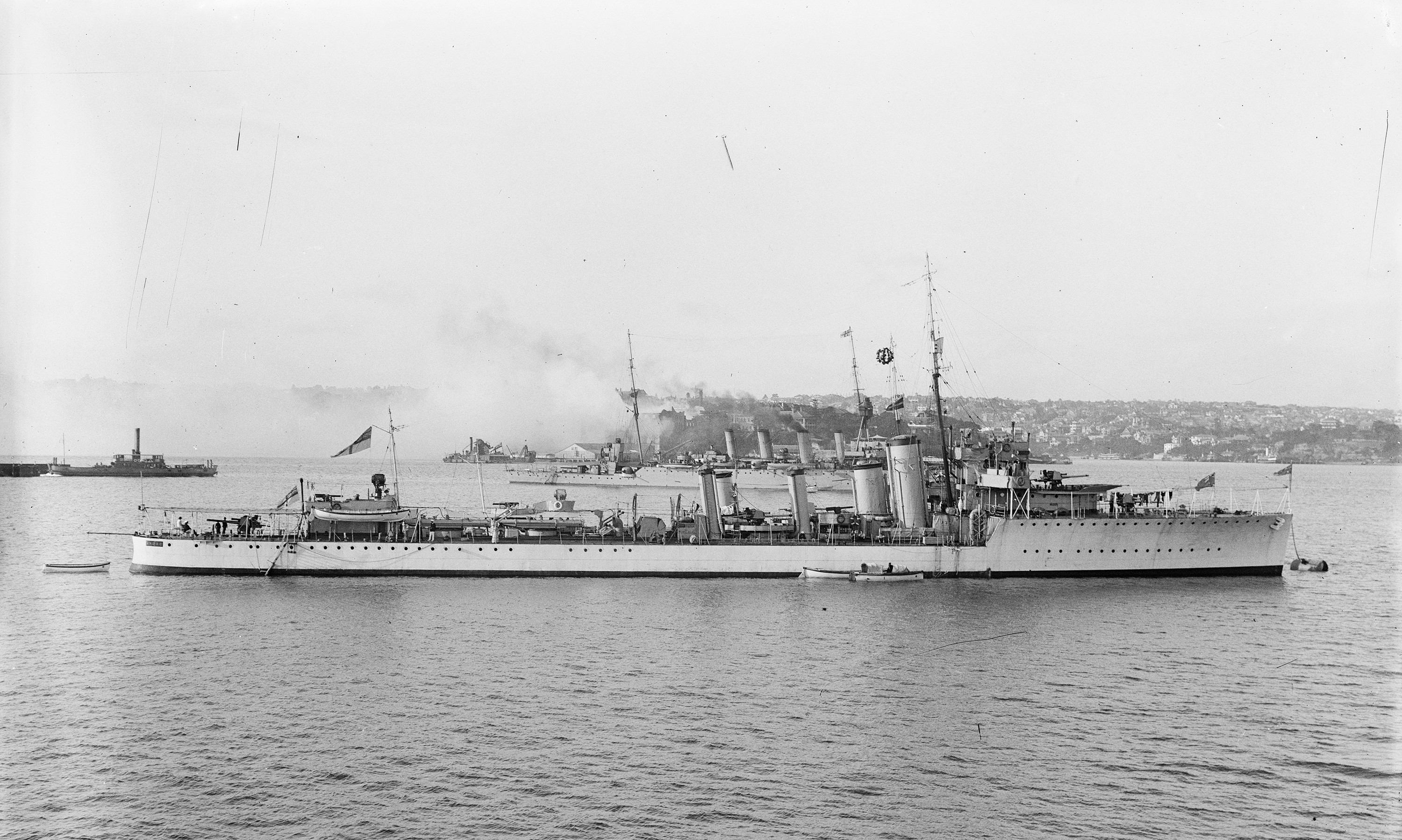
- HMAS "Anzac", Port Jackson, Sydney, c. 1925

History

United Kingdom
- Namesake: The Australian and New Zealand Army Corps
- Ordered: December 1915
- Builder: William Denny and Brothers, Dumbarton
- Laid down: 31 January 1916
- Launched: 11 January 1917
- Commissioned: 24 April 1917
- Decommissioned: March 1919
- Identification: Pennant number: F61, G60, G50 then G70
- Fate: Transferred to RAN

Australia
- Acquired: March 1919
- Commissioned: 27 January 1920
- Decommissioned: 30 July 1931
- Identification: Pennant number: G90
- Fate: Sunk as target 7 May 1936
- Badge

General characteristics
- Class & type: Parker-class leader
- Displacement: 1,660 tons
- Length: 327 ft 7 in (99.85 m) length overall; 314 ft 11.25 in (95.9930 m) between perpendiculars
- Beam: 31 ft 10 in (9.70 m)
- Draught: 13 ft 9.75 in (4.2101 m) maximum
- Propulsion: 4 × Yarrow boilers, Brown-Curtis geared turbines, 37,060 shp, 3 propellers
- Speed: 34 knots (63 km/h; 39 mph) (designed)
- Range: 3,360 nautical miles (6,220 km; 3,870 mi) at 11.5 knots (21.3 km/h; 13.2 mph)
- Complement: 122
- Armament: 4 × single QF 4-inch Mark IV guns; 2 × 2-pounder "pom-pom" guns; 1 × .303-inch Maxim machine gun; 4 × .303-inch Lewis machine guns (2 single, 1 twin-mount); 2 × twin 21 inch (533 mm) torpedo tube sets; 2 × depth charge throwers; 4 × depth charge chutes

HMAS Anzac was a Parker-class destroyer leader that served in the Royal Navy (as HMS Anzac) and the Royal Australian Navy (RAN). Launched in early 1917 and commissioned into the Royal Navy, Anzac led the 14th Destroyer Flotilla of the Grand Fleet during the First World War. In 1919, she and five other destroyers were transferred to the RAN, with Anzac commissioning as an Australian warship in 1920. Except for three visits to New Guinea and one to the Solomon Islands, Anzac remained in southern and eastern Australian waters for her entire career. The destroyer was decommissioned in 1931, sold for scrapping four years later, stripped for parts, then towed outside Sydney Heads and sunk as a target ship in 1936.

== Design and construction ==
Anzac was a Parker-class destroyer leader, based on the Marksman or Lightfoot class. The ship had a displacement of 1,660 tons, was 327 feet 7 inches (99.85 m) long overall and 314 feet 11 1/4 inches (95.99 m) long between perpendiculars, had a beam of 31 feet 10 inches (9.70 m), and a draught of 13 feet 9 3/4 inches (4.21 m) at maximum load. Propulsion was provided by four Yarrow boilers providing steam to Brown-Curtis geared turbines, which delivered 37,060 shaft horsepower to the destroyer's three propellers. The ship was designed to reach 34 knots (63 km/h; 39 mph), but could only achieve an average of 32.9 knots (60.9 km/h; 37.9 mph) during full-power trials. Maximum range was 3,360 nautical miles (6,220 km; 3,870 mi) at 11.5 knots (21.3 km/h; 13.2 mph). The ship's company consisted of 8 officers and 114 sailors.

The primary armament for Anzac consisted of four single QF 4-inch Mark IV guns. This was supplemented by two 2-pounder "pom-pom" guns for air defence, a single .303-inch Maxim machine gun, four .303-inch Lewis machine guns (two single guns and a twin-mount), two twin 21 inch (533 mm) torpedo tube sets, two depth charge throwers, and four depth charge chutes.

The order to build Anzac was placed with William Denny and Brothers in December 1915, and the ship was laid down at their shipyard in Dumbarton, Scotland on 31 January 1916. The destroyer was launched on 11 January 1917, and commissioned into the Royal Navy on 24 April 1917, the day of her completion. The ship's name is in recognition of the Australian and New Zealand Army Corps and their service during the early years of the First World War. The destroyer went through a rapid succession of penant numbers during her British service; although assigned the pennant F6 during construction, this was changed three days before launch to G80, then became G50 at the start of 1918, before changing again to G70 in April.

== Operational history ==
=== Royal Navy ===
On entering service, Anzac was assigned to lead the 14th Destroyer Flotilla of the Grand Fleet, based at Scapa Flow. Anzac served in the North Sea and the English Channel during the First World War. On 26 June 1917, Anzac went to the assistance of the submarine K1, which had run aground. In August 1918, Anzac was damaged in a heavy storm, requiring the replacement of her exhaust funnels and several of the ship's boats.

After the war ended, Anzac was placed into reserve at Portsmouth. On 21 March 1919, Anzac and five S-class destroyers were transferred to the RAN as a gift. Anzac was commissioned into RAN service on 27 January 1920, and departed from Plymouth on 26 February for the voyage to Australia. Early in the voyage, a propeller blade was damaged, so the destroyer had to return to Plymouth for repairs. Anzac departed again on 10 March, and arrived in Sydney on 29 April, having visited Gibraltar, Suez, Aden, Bombay, Colombo, Singapore, Surabaya, and Thursday Island en route.

=== Royal Australian Navy ===
Anzac spent most of her early RAN career operating off the southern and eastern coasts of Australia. In December 1922, the change of commanding officer aboard the ship saw the captain relieved by his twin brother. Visits were made to New Guinea in June and July 1924, and in May 1926.

The destroyer was decommissioned on 4 August 1926, then recommissioned on 10 January 1928. During 1928, Anzac was on standby as a rescue ship for two of Charles Kingsford Smith's pioneering flights: in June as Southern Cross approached Brisbane on the last leg of the first trans-Pacific flight, then in September off Sydney for Kingsford Smith's departure on the first successful trans-Tasman flight. The ship continued operating in Australian waters, except for a visit to New Guinea and the Solomon Islands in September 1930.

== Decommissioning and fate ==
Anzac paid off for disposal on 30 July 1931. The ship was sold to Messrs. Abraham and Wilson of Redfern, New South Wales on 8 August 1935 for scrapping. Anzac was stripped down to a hulk, then towed outside Sydney Heads on 7 May 1936 and sunk as a target ship.
