= HMS Tirade =

Destroyer of the Royal Navy

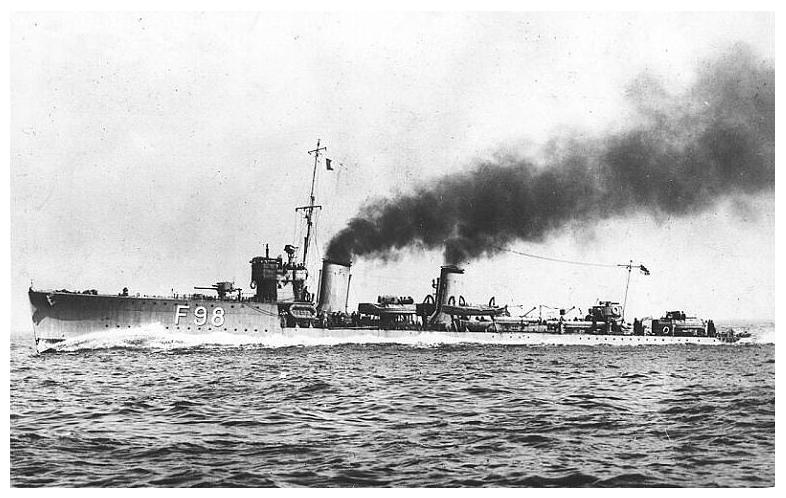
- HMS Tower during sea trialsSister ship HMS Tower during sea trials

History

United Kingdom
- Name: HMS Tirade
- Ordered: March 1916
- Builder: Scotts Shipbuilding and Engineering Company, Greenock
- Yard number: 478
- Laid down: 1 May 1916
- Launched: 21 April 1917
- Commissioned: 30 June 1917
- Out of service: 15 November 1921
- Fate: Sold to be broken up

General characteristics
- Class & type: Modified Admiralty R-class destroyer
- Displacement: 1,035 long tons (1,052 t) (normal)
- Length: 276 ft (84.1 m) (o.a.)
- Beam: 27 ft (8.2 m)
- Draught: 11 ft (3.4 m)
- Propulsion: 3 Yarrow boilers; 2 geared Brown-Curtis steam turbines, 27,000 shp (20,000 kW)
- Speed: 36 knots (41.4 mph; 66.7 km/h)
- Range: 3,450 nmi (6,390 km) at 15 kn (28 km/h)
- Complement: 82
- Armament: 3 × single QF 4-inch (102 mm) Mark IV guns; 1 × single 2-pdr 40 mm (2 in) AA gun; 2 × twin 21 in (533 mm) torpedo tubes

HMS Tirade was a Modified Admiralty R-class destroyer which served with the Royal Navy during World War I. The Modified R class added attributes of the Yarrow Later M class to improve the capability of the ships to operate in bad weather. Launched in April 1917 by Scotts Shipbuilding and Engineering Company, the vessel served with the Grand Fleet. The vessel was involved in escorting convoys in the Irish Sea and North Sea. During one of these duties, in September 1917, Tirade sank the minelaying submarine UC-55. During the following month, the destroyer accidentally struck and sank the M-class destroyer Marmion. After the war the destroyer was placed in reserve and then, in November 1921, was sold to be broken up.

== Design and development ==
Tirade was one of eleven Modified R-class destroyers ordered by the British Admiralty in March 1916 as part of the Eighth War Construction Programme. The design was a development of the existing R class, adding features from the Yarrow Later M class which had been introduced based on wartime experience. The forward two boilers were transposed and vented through a single funnel, enabling the bridge and forward gun to be placed further aft. Combined with hull-strengthening, this improved the destroyers' ability to operate at high speed in bad weather. s Tirade was 276 feet (84.12 m) long overall and 265 feet (80.77 m) long between perpendiculars, with a beam of 27 feet (8.2 m) and a draught of 11 feet (3.35 m). Displacement was 975 long tons (991 t) normal and 1,076 long tons (1,093 t) at deep load. Power was provided by three Yarrow boilers feeding two Brown-Curtis geared steam turbines rated at 27,000 shaft horsepower (20,000 kW) and driving two shafts, to give a design speed of 36 knots (67 km/h; 41 mph). Two funnels were fitted. A total of 296 long tons (301 t) of fuel oil were carried, giving a design range of 3,450 nautical miles (6,390 km; 3,970 mi) at 15 knots (28 km/h; 17 mph).

Armament consisted of three single QF 4-inch (102 mm) Mk IV guns on the ship's centreline, with one on the forecastle, one aft on a raised platform and one between the funnels. Increased elevation extended the range of the gun by 1,800 metres (2,000 yd) to 11,000 metres (12,000 yd). A single 2-pounder 40 mm (2 in) "pom-pom" anti-aircraft gun was carried on a platform between two twin mounts for 21 in (533 mm) torpedoes. The destroyer was subsequently equipped with the ability to drop depth charges. The ship had a complement of 82 officers and ratings.

== Construction and career ==
Laid down by Scotts at Greenock on 1 May 1916 with the yard number 478, Tirade was launched on 21 April 1917. The vessel was completed on 30 June. On commissioning, Tirade joined the Fifteenth Destroyer Flotilla of the Grand Fleet.

Tirade initially served from Lough Swilly, Ireland, on convoy escort duty in the Irish Sea. On 28 July 1917, the destroyer was escorting a convoy of three oilers when the submarine U-61 attacked, but all the ships were able to reach Lough Swilly. The destroyer first saw action alongside Thornycroft M-class destroyer Rapid in August 1917 when the vessel unsuccessfully attacked a fleeing submarine with depth charges. Tirade relocated to Scapa Flow to escort convoys travelling in the North Sea between the United Kingdom and Norway.

On 29 September, the armed trawler HMT Moravia identified the submarine minelayer UC-55 surfaced, suffering from a lack of rudder control and failing batteries, and attempting to scuttle. Tirade attacked, firing her forward 4 in (102 mm) gun from 3,400 yards (3,100 m). The third shell struck the submarine's conning tower, killing the commander, and the fifth holed the hull below the waterline. The destroyer delivered the coup de grace with two depth charges, which blew up the submarine. Tirade rescued two of the nineteen survivors from the water. On 21 October, the destroyer accidentally collided with the Admiralty M-class destroyer Marmion while escorting a convoy off Lerwick. Tirade received little damage but Marmion foundered and sank.

At the end of World War I, Tirade was still part of the Fifteenth Destroyer Flotilla under the flotilla leader Campbell. The vessel was transferred to the 5th Destroyer Flotilla under the flag of King George V when the Home Fleet was formed, but was transferred to the Reserve Fleet at the Nore on 28 November 1919. However, the Royal Navy needed to reduce both the number of ships and personnel to save money. The destroyer spent less than two years in reserve before being sold to Cashmore of Newport, Wales, on 15 November 1921 and broken up.

== Pennant numbers ==
Pennant number	Date
F81	January 1917
G80	January 1918
F07	January 1919
HA7	January 1922
