= HMS Negro (1916) =

Destroyer of the Royal Navy

Coordinates: 59.610°N 1.391°W

History

United Kingdom
- Builder: Palmers Shipbuilding and Iron Company, Jarrow
- Launched: 8 March 1916
- Fate: Sank following collision 21 December 1916

General characteristics
- Class & type: Admiralty M-class destroyer
- Displacement: 994 long tons (1,010 t) standard; 1,042 long tons (1,059 t) full load
- Length: 269 ft (82 m)
- Beam: 27 ft 6 in (8.38 m)
- Draught: 8 ft 8 in (2.64 m) mean; 10 ft 6 in (3.20 m) maximum
- Propulsion: 3 shafts, steam turbines, 25,000 shp (18,642 kW)
- Speed: 34 knots (39.1 mph; 63.0 km/h)
- Range: 237–298 tons fuel oil
- Complement: 80
- Armament: 3 × QF 4 in (102 mm) Mark IV guns, mounting P Mk. IX; 2 × single QF 2-pounder "pom-pom" Mk. II; 2 × twin 21 inch (533 mm) torpedo tubes

HMS Negro (Note: Royal Navy destroyers had been grouped into alphabetical classes since 1913, with new destroyers having names beginning with their class letter. The large orders placed for M-class destroyers following the outbreak of the First World War resulted in names beginning with N, P and O also being used for ships of the class.) was an Admiralty M-class destroyer of the Royal Navy. She was built by Palmers at Jarrow, Tyneside and launched 8 March 1916, but was sunk after colliding with HMS Hoste in the North Sea on 21 December 1916; depth charges from Hoste exploded and blew out Negro's hull plating. The ship was the second Royal Navy warship to bear the name Negro with the first being the 1813 Negro, ex-Niger.

== Description ==
The Admiralty M class were improved and faster versions of the preceding Laforey-class destroyer. They displaced 971 long tons (987 t). The ships had an overall length of 273 feet 4 inches (83.3 m), a beam of 26 feet 8 inches (8.1 m) and a draught of 9 feet 8 inches (2.9 m). They were powered by three Parsons direct-drive steam turbines, each driving one propeller shaft, using steam provided by four Yarrow boilers. The turbines developed a total of 25,000 shaft horsepower (19,000 kW) and gave a maximum speed of 34 knots (63 km/h; 39 mph). The ships carried a maximum of 237 long tons (241 t) of fuel oil that gave them a range of 2,100 nautical miles (3,900 km; 2,400 mi) at 15 knots (28 km/h; 17 mph). The ships' complement was 76 officers and ratings.

The ships were armed with three single QF 4-inch (102 mm) Mark IV guns and two QF 1.5-pounder (37 mm) anti-aircraft guns. These latter guns were later replaced by a pair of QF 2-pounder (40 mm) "pom-pom" anti-aircraft guns. The ships were also fitted with two above water twin mounts for 21-inch (533 mm) torpedoes.

== Construction ==
The outbreak of the First World War meant that the Royal Navy had a requirement for large numbers of extra destroyers to replace expected war losses, and a number of large orders were quickly placed, with existing types such as the M class being favoured to allow rapid construction. Negro was one of ten M-class destroyers ordered as part of the Second War Programme in early November 1914. She was laid down at Palmers Shipbuilding and Iron Company's Jarrow shipyard in January 1915, was launched on 8 March 1916 and completed in May 1916.

== Service ==
On commissioning, Negro joined the 13th Destroyer Flotilla of the Grand Fleet. Having only recently been completed, Negro did not sail with her Flotilla on 30 May 1916 to take part in the Battle of Jutland on 31 May – 1 June, although in the aftermath of the battle she did help to escort the damaged battleship Warspite back to Rosyth. On 18 August 1916, the Grand Fleet sailed in response to a sortie by the German High Seas Fleet. The two fleets failed to meet each other before the Germans withdrew, but as the Grand Fleet was heading for home, the light cruiser Falmouth was torpedoed twice by the German submarine U-66 at 16:52hr. Negro along with the destroyers Pasley and Pelican came to Falmouth's aid and after U-66 was driven off by Pelican, escorted the damaged cruiser as she slowly made her way towards the Humber estuary. Despite a strong destroyer escort, which grew to nine destroyers, Falmouth was struck by two more torpedoes from U-63 at noon on 20 August. Falmouth eventually sank at 08:10hr on 21 August near Flamborough Head.

=== Sinking ===
On 19 December 1916, the Grand Fleet left Scapa Flow to carry out exercises between Shetland and Norway. On the morning of 20 December, the Flotilla leader Hoste suffered a failure of her steering gear at high speed, almost colliding with several other ships, and was detached to return to Scapa with Negro as escort. At about 01:30 hr on 21 December, in extremely poor weather, with gale-force winds and a heavy sea, Hoste's rudder jammed again, forcing the ship into a sudden turn to port. Negro, following about 400 yards (370 m) behind, collided with Hoste. The collision knocked two depth charges off Hoste's stern which exploded, badly damaging the rear end of Hoste and blowing in the bottom of Negro's hull, flooding her engine room. Negro sank quickly, and despite the efforts of the destroyer Marmion to rescue survivors, fifty-one officers and men of Negro's crew were killed. Marmion and Marvel attempted to tow the crippled Hoste back to Scapa, but after three hours, Hoste began to founder. Despite the severe conditions, Marvel went alongside Hoste to rescue the crew of the sinking ship, and when repeatedly forced apart by the heavy seas, repeated the manoeuvre another twelve times. While Marvel sustained damage to her forecastle from repeated impacts between the two ships, she managed to rescue all but four of Hoste's crew before Hoste finally sank. Eight officers and 126 men were rescued by Marvel.

== Wreck ==
In August 2023, the wrecks of Hoste and Negro were located and identified. Negro is lying at a depth of 100 metres (330 ft) in two pieces, close to each other, north-east of Fair Isle. She was firmly identified by the ship's bell.
