= List of ship names of the Royal Navy (O–Q) =

This is a list of Royal Navy ship names starting with the letters O, P and Q.

== O ==
- O1
- Oak
- Oakham Castle
- Oakington
- Oakley
- Obdurate
- Obedient
- Oberon
- Observateur
- Observer
- Ocean
- Oceanic
- Oceanway
- Ocelot
- Ockham
- Octavia
- Odiham
- Odin
- Odzani
- Offa
- Ogre
- Oiseau
- Okehampton
- Old Francis
- Old James
- Old Lawrence
- Old President
- Old Roebuck
- Old Success
- Old Truelove
- Old Warwick
- Olive Branch
- Olympia
- Olympus
- Omdurman
- Onondaga
- Onslaught
- Onslow
- Ontario
- Onyx
- Opal
- Ophelia
- Opossum
- Opportune
- Oracle
- Orange
- Orange Tree
- Orangeville
- Orby
- Orcadia
- Orchis
- Oreste
- Orestes
- Orford
- Orford Ness
- Orford Prize
- Oriana
- Oribi
- Oriflamme
- Orilla
- Oriole
- Orion
- Orissa
- Orkan
- Orkney
- Orlando
- Orlionoch
- Ormonde
- Ornen
- Oronoque
- Orontes
- Oroonoko
- Orpheus
- Orquijo
- Ortenzia
- Orwell
- Oryx
- Osborne
- Osiris
- Osprey
- Ossington
- Ossory
- Ostend
- Ostrich
- Oswald
- Oswego
- Oswestry Castle
- Otranto
- Otter
- Otus
- Oudenarde
- Oulston
- Oundle
- Ouragan
- Ouse
- Overton
- Overyssel
- Owen
- Owen Glendower
- Owl
- Owners Adventure
- Owners Goodwill
- Owners Love
- Oxford
- Oxford Castle
- Oxlip

== P ==
- P11
- P12
- P13
- P14
- P15
- P16
- P17
- P18
- P19
- P20
- P21
- P22
- P23
- P24
- P25
- P26
- P27
- P28
- P29
- P30
- P31
- P32
- P33
- P34
- P35
- P36
- P37
- P38
- P39
- P40
- P41
- P45
- P46
- P47
- P48
- P49
- P50
- P52
- P53
- P54
- P57
- P58
- P59
- P64
- P222
- P311
- P411
- P412
- P413
- P511
- P512
- P514
- P551
- P552
- P553
- P554
- P555
- P556
- P611
- P612
- P614
- P615
- P711
- P712
- P714
- Pacific
- Packahunta
- Packington
- Pactolus
- Padstow
- Padstow Bay
- Pagham
- Pakenham
- Paladin
- Palinurus
- Pallas
- Palliser
- Palm Tree
- Palma
- Palomares
- Paluma
- Pandora
- Pandour
- Pangbourne
- Panglima
- Pansy
- Pantaloon
- Panther
- Papillon
- Papua
- Paradox
- Paragon
- Paramour
- Parapet
- Paris
- Parker
- Parkes
- Parret
- Parrot
- Parrsboro
- Parry Sound
- Parthian
- Partridge
- Pasley
- Pat Barton
- Pathan
- Pathfinder
- Patrician
- Patrick
- Patriot
- Patrol
- Patroller
- Patton
- Paul
- Paulina
- Pauncey
- Paz
- PC42
- PC43
- PC44
- PC51
- PC55
- PC56
- PC60
- PC61
- PC62
- PC63
- PC65
- PC66
- PC67
- PC68
- PC69
- PC70
- PC71
- PC72
- PC73
- PC74
- Peace
- Peacock
- Peard
- Pearl
- Pearl Prize
- Pearlen
- Pedro
- Pegase
- Pegasus
- Peggy
- Pegwell Bay
- Pelargonium
- Pelican
- Pelican Prize
- Pellew
- Pelorus
- Pelter
- Pembroke
- Pembroke II
- Pembroke Castle
- Pembroke Prize
- Penang
- Pendennis
- Pendennis Castle
- Penelope
- Penetang
- Penguin
- Penlee Point
- Penn
- Pennywort
- Pentstemon
- Penston
- Penylan
- Penzance
- Peony
- Pera
- Perdrix
- Peregrine
- Peregrine Galley
- Peregrine Prize
- Perim
- Periwinkle
- Perlen
- Persephone
- Perseus
- Perseverance
- Persian
- Persimmon
- Persistent
- Pert
- Perth
- Peruvian
- Pesaquid
- Pet
- Petard
- Peter Pomegranate
- Peter
- Peterborough
- Peterel
- Peterell
- Peterhead
- Peterman
- Petersfield
- Petersham
- Petite Victoire
- Petrel
- Petrolla
- Petulant
- Petunia
- Pevensey Castle
- Peyton
- Phaeton
- Pheasant
- Philip
- Philip & Mary
- Phillimore
- Philoctetes
- Philomel
- Phipps
- Phlegethon
- Phlox
- Phoebe
- Phoenix
- Phosphorus
- Pickle
- Picotee
- Picton
- Pictou
- Piemontaise
- Piercer
- Pigeon
- Pigmy
- Pigot
- Pike
- Pilchard
- Pilford
- Pilot
- Pilote
- Pimpernel
- Pincher
- Pineham
- Pink
- Pinner
- Pintail
- Pioneer
- Piorun
- Pique
- Pirie
- Pirouette
- Pitcairn
- Pitt
- Pittington
- Placentia
- Planet
- Plantagenet
- Plassy
- Platy Prize
- Platypus
- Plessisville
- Plover
- Plucky
- Plumper
- Plumpton
- Pluto
- Plym
- Plymouth
- Plymouth Prize
- Plymouth Transport
- Pocahontas
- Pochard
- Podargus
- Poictiers
- Pointe Claire
- Polacca
- Polar Circle
- Polaris
- Polecat
- Pollington
- Pollux
- Polperro
- Polruan
- Polsham
- Polyanthus
- Polyphemus
- Pomona
- Pomone
- Pompee
- Pondicherry
- Pontypool
- Poole
- Popham
- Popinjay
- Poppy
- Porcupine
- Porgey
- Porlock
- Porlock Bay
- Porpoise
- Port Antonio
- Port Arthur
- Port Colborne
- Port d'Espagne
- Port Hope
- Port Mahon
- Port Morant
- Port Royal
- Port Wespagne
- Portage
- Portchester Castle
- Portcullis
- Porthleven
- Portia
- Portisham
- Portland
- Portland Bill
- Portland Prize
- Porto
- Portreath
- Portsmouth
- Portsmouth Prize
- Portsmouth Shallop
- Portway
- Poseidon
- Post
- Postboy
- Postillion
- Potentilla
- Poulette
- Poulmic
- Pouncer
- Poundmaker
- Powderham
- Powerful
- Pozarica
- Premier
- Prescott
- President
- Prestatyn
- Preston
- Prestonian
- Prevention
- Prevost
- Prevoyante
- Primrose
- Primula
- Prince
- Prince Albert
- Prince Arthur
- Prince Augustus Frederick
- Prince Charles
- Prince Consort
- Prince de Neuchatel
- Prince Edward
- Prince Eugene
- Prince Frederick
- Prince George
- Prince Henry
- Prince Leopold
- Prince of Orange
- Prince of Wales
- Prince Regent
- Prince Royal
- Prince Rupert
- Prince William
- Princess
- Princess Alice
- Princess Amelia
- Princess Anne
- Princess Augusta
- Princess Carolina
- Princess Caroline
- Princess Charlotte
- Princess Ena
- Princess Irene
- Princess Iris
- Princess Louisa
- Princess Margaret
- Princess Maria
- Princess Mary
- Princess of Orange
- Princess Royal
- Princess Sophia Frederica
- Princessa
- Princesse
- Prins Albert
- Prinses Astrid
- Prinses Beatrix
- Privet
- Prize
- Procris
- Proctor
- Prodigal
- Progresso
- Prohibition
- Project
- Prometheus
- Prompt Prize
- Prompt
- Prompte
- Proselyte
- Proserpine
- Prosperity
- Prospero
- Prosperous
- Protea
- Protector
- Proteus
- Prothee
- Providence
- Providence Prize
- Provo
- Prowse
- Prudent
- Prudente
- Psyche
- Puck
- Puckeridge
- Puffin
- Puissant
- Pulham
- Pultusk
- Puma
- Pumba
- Puncher
- Puncheston
- Punjab
- Punjabi
- Punjaub
- Puntoone
- Pursuer
- Puttenham
- Pyl
- Pylades
- Pyramus
- Pyrrhus
- Pytchley
- Python

== Q ==
- Quadra
- Quadrant
- Quadrille
- Quail
- Quainton
- Quaker
- Qualicum
- Quality
- Quantock
- Quebec
- Queen
- Queen Charlotte
- Queen Elizabeth
- Queen Emma
- Queen Mab
- Queen Mary
- Queen of Kent
- Queenborough
- Quentin
- Quesnel
- Quest
- Quiberon
- Quickmatch
- Quilliam
- Quinte
- Quittance
- Quorn

== See also ==
- List of aircraft carriers of the Royal Navy
- List of amphibious warfare ships of the Royal Navy
- List of battlecruisers of the Royal Navy
- List of pre-dreadnought battleships of the Royal Navy
- List of dreadnought battleships of the Royal Navy
- List of cruiser classes of the Royal Navy
- List of destroyer classes of the Royal Navy
- List of patrol vessels of the Royal Navy
- List of frigate classes of the Royal Navy
- List of mine countermeasure vessels of the Royal Navy (includes minesweepers and mine hunters)
- List of monitors of the Royal Navy
- List of Royal Fleet Auxiliary ship names
- List of Royal Navy shore establishments
- List of submarines of the Royal Navy
- List of survey vessels of the Royal Navy
