= Poppy (disambiguation) =

A poppy is any flower in the plant family Papaveraceae which has the common name poppy.

Poppy or Poppies may also refer to:

== People ==
- Poppy (given name), including a list of people and fictional characters
- Poppy (nickname), a list of people
- Poppy (singer) (born 1995), American singer and YouTube personality
- Andrew Poppy (born 1954), English composer, pianist and record producer
- Karabo Poppy (born 1992), South African illustrator

== Places ==
- Poppy Mountain, Massachusetts
- Poppy Peak, California (see Poppy Peak Historic District)

== Arts and entertainment ==
=== Film, stage, and television ===
- Poppy (1917 film), an American film starring Norma Talmadge
- Poppy (1923 musical), a Broadway comedy starring W. C. Fields
- Poppy (1936 film), based on the 1923 musical and again starring W. C. Fields
- Poppy (1952 film), an Italian comedy film starring Walter Chiari
- Poppy (1982 musical), a comedy about the Opium Wars
- Poppies (film), an animated short
- "Poppy", a 2002 episode of The Brak Show

=== Music ===
- "Poppy", a song from the album Desperate Youth, Blood Thirsty Babes by TV on the Radio
- "Poppy", a song from K.I.D.S. by Mac Miller
- "Poppy", a 2022 song by STAYC
- "Poppies", a song by Patti Smith Group from their 1976 album Radio Ethiopia
- "Poppies", the first track on the debut album by Marcy Playground

=== Literature ===
- Poppy (novel), a children's novel
- Poppies (poem), a poem by Mary Oliver

== Vessels ==
- HMS Poppy, two 20th-century Royal Navy ships
- USAHS Blanche F. Sigman, a 1943 World War II US Army hospital ship originally assigned the name USAHS Poppy
- USS Poppy (1863), an American Civil War steamboat

== Other uses ==
- Poppy (publisher), a publisher of children's books
- Poppy (satellite), a 1971 series of US intelligence satellites
- Dedalus Poppy, a homebuilt 1980s ultralight aircraft

== See also ==
- Remembrance poppy, a symbol worn mostly in countries of the British Commonwealth to commemorate veterans killed in war
- Poppi, a comune in Italy
- The Poppies (disambiguation), various musical groups and sports team nicknames
- Popy, a toy manufacturer
- Poppie, a fictional character in the Seinfeld television series
