= Otus =

Otus may refer to:

- Otus (education), a K-12 educational technology company
- HMS Otus, two ships in the Royal Navy
- Otus (bird), genus of owls
- Otus (mythology), giant in Greek mythology, brother of Ephialtes, one of Aloadae
- Otus of Cyllene, hero in Greek mythology, killed by Hector in Trojan War
- USS Otus (ARG-20) (1940–1946), an internal combustion engine repair ship
- "Otus the Head Cat", weekly column in the Arkansas Democrat-Gazette by Michael Storey
- Otus (lens), high-performance lens series by Carl Zeiss AG
- Tonmi Lillman or Otus (1973–2012), member of a band Lordi
- "of the United States", as in POTUS (President of the United States), FLOTUS (First Lady of the United States), and SCOTUS (Supreme Court of the United States)
- Moto E (2nd generation) 3G, a Motorola Android smartphone, codename otus
- Otus, a playable character from the 2016 Video Game Owlboy from D-Pad Studio
- Operational taxonomic unit, operational taxonomic units in biology

== People with the surname ==
- Erol Otus (21st century), American artist
