= Oiseau =

Oiseau (French for bird) may refer to:

- HMS Oiseau, three Royal Navy frigates, one of them a captured French frigate of the same name
- French ship Oiseau, two French Navy frigates
- Oiseau (1797 privateer), a French privateer eventually captured by the Royal Navy
- "Oiseau", a section of Eunoia, an anthology of univocalics by Christian Bök

== See also ==
- Oiseaux (disambiguation)
