= Portsmouth (disambiguation) =

Portsmouth is a city in Hampshire, England.

Portsmouth may also refer to:

== Places ==
=== Canada ===
- Portsmouth, Kingston, Ontario

=== Dominica ===
- Portsmouth, Dominica
- Portsmouth (Dominica constituency)

=== United Kingdom ===
- Portsmouth, West Yorkshire
- Portsmouth (UK Parliament constituency), a constituency abolished 1918

=== United States ===
- Portsmouth, Iowa
- Portsmouth, New Hampshire
- Portsmouth, North Carolina, a village
  - Portsmouth Island, North Carolina
- Portsmouth, Ohio
- Portsmouth, Portland, Oregon
- Portsmouth, Rhode Island
- Portsmouth, Virginia
- Portsmouth Township, Michigan
- Portsmouth Square, a park in San Francisco

== Ships ==
- HMS Portsmouth, several ships with the name
- USS Portsmouth, several ships with the name
- United States lightship Portsmouth (LV-101)

== Sport ==
- Portsmouth F.C., an English football club
- Portsmouth Spartans, a former professional American football franchise, now the Detroit Lions
- Portsmouth Invitational Tournament, a basketball tournament
- Portsmouth yardstick, a handicapping system for yacht racing

== Other uses ==
- "Portsmouth" (instrumental), an English folk tune
- Portsmouth Naval Shipyard, a U.S. Navy base in Kittery, Maine
- Treaty of Portsmouth, a 1905 treaty ending the Russo-Japanese War

== See also ==
- USS Portsmouth, a list of ships
