= List of ships named Belfast =

Several ships have been named Belfast:

- PS Belfast, a paddle steamer built in 1829 for service between Glasgow and Belfast, then HMS Prospero from 1837
- SS Belfast (1884), a Dublin-Liverpool passenger-cargo steamer of the City of Dublin Steam Packet Company, later sold to Latvia
- SS Belfast (1908), a coastal passenger ship of Eastern Steamship Lines, running between Boston, Massachusetts and Bangor, Maine
- HMS Belfast, a Town-class cruiser launched in 1938, now a museum ship in London
- USS Belfast, a Tacoma-class frigate in commission from 1943 to 1945 and then transferred to the Soviet Union
- HMS Belfast (Type 26 frigate), the third planned of the type
