= Privett (disambiguation) =

Privett is a village in the East Hampshire district, in the county of Hampshire, England.

Privett may also refer to:

- Privett, Gosport, a location in Hampshire, England
- Privett (surname), a family name (including a list of persons with the name)

== See also ==
- Privet, a flowering plant in the genus Ligustrum
- Privet (disambiguation)
