= F57 =

F57 may refer to:

- F57 (classification), disability sport classification for disability athletics for people who compete in field events from a seated position
- HMAS Queenborough (F57), Q-class destroyer that served in the Royal Navy (RN) and Royal Australian Navy (RAN)
- HMS Andromeda (F57), Leander-class frigate of the Royal Navy
- The Blue Whale Challenge is occasionally referred to as F57. Participants were told to carve ‘F57’ into their wrists to complete one of many self-destructive challenges
