= Ostrich (disambiguation) =

An ostrich is a type of large flightless bird.

Ostrich may also refer to:

== Animals ==
- Common ostrich (Struthio camelus), the more widespread of the two living species of ostrich
- Pachystruthio, a genus of prehistoric animals known as giant ostrich
- Ostrich dinosaur or Ornithomimosauria, a group of bird-like dinosaurs
- Ostrich foot shell, any of the molluscs in the genus Struthiolaria

== Plants ==
- Ostrich fern (Matteuccia struthiopteris)
- Ostrich plume or red ginger (Alpinia purpurata)

== Entertainment ==
- Ostrich (album), by Crack the Sky, 2012
- An Ostrich Told Me the World Is Fake and I Think I Believe It, a 2021 stop-motion animated short film
- Ossie Ostrich, Australian television show puppet
- "The Ostrich", novelty single by Lou Reed
- Ostrich GT, a record label founded by Jack Straker of Beachbuggy

== Science and technology ==
=== Journals ===
- Ostrich (journal), a journal of African ornithology

=== Ships ===
- HMS Ostrich, more than one ship of the British Royal Navy
- USS Ostrich, more than one United States Navy ship

=== Technical principles ===
- Ostrich algorithm, computer science terminology
- Ostrich effect, behavioural finance terminology
- Ostrich strategy, economics terminology

== Other ==
- Ostrich guitar, an unconventional guitar tuning scheme
- Ostrich leather
- Ostrich Media, a British company
- Ostrich people, the Vadoma or Wadoma people from the west of Zimbabwe, many of whom have only two large toes like an ostrich
