= HMS Oak =

Two ships of the Royal Navy have borne the name HMS Oak, after the tree, the oak:

- HMS Oak (1652) was a former Dutch ship captured in 1652, and added to the Commonwealth of England Navy. She was burnt by a fireship in July 1653 in action with the Dutch.
- HMS Oak (1912) was Acheron-class destroyer launched in 1912. She was sold in 1921 and was broken up the following year.

== See also ==
- HMS Oakham Castle
- HMS Oakington
- HMS Oakley
- HMS Royal Oak

Note that the early ships named HMS Royal Oak were often mentioned in records with the word "Royal" omitted.
