= Peony (disambiguation) =

The peony is a flowering plant.

Peony may also refer to:

- HMS Peony, the name of two Royal Navy ships
- USS Peony (1864), a Union Navy steamer acquired near the end of the American Civil War
- Peony (novel), by Pearl S. Buck
- Peony, one of nine chimpanzees used in a language experiment detailed in the book, The Mind of an Ape
- Peony Star (a name for WR 102ka from the Peony Nebula in which it is embedded), one of several candidates for the most luminous known star in the Milky Way
  - Peony Nebula, whose name comes from its appearance
