= Primula (disambiguation) =

Primula is a genus of 400–500 species of low-growing herbs in the family Primulaceae.

Primula may refer to:

- 970 Primula, a main belt asteroid
- Autobianchi Primula, a small car
- Belgian minehunter Primula (M924), a Tripartite-class minehunter
- Primula (food), the trade name of a cheese-based spread
- Primula (Shuffle!), a Shuffle! character
- HMS Primula, more than one ship of the British Royal Navy
