= HMS Plucky =

Four vessels of the British Royal Navy have been named HMS Plucky:

- HMS Plucky was a 212-ton steam tender purchased in 1856 and sold in 1858.
- HMS Plucky (1870) was a 196-ton iron-screw gunboat that was launched at Portsmouth Dockyard on 13 July 1870. Renamed HMS Banterer in June 1915. It was sold in 1928.
- HMS Plucky (1916) was an Admiralty M-class destroyer that was launched at Scotts, Greenock on 21 April 1916. It was sold for breaking up 9 May 1921, and scrapped in 1924.
- HMS Plucky (1943) was an Algerine-class minesweeper that was launched at Harland and Wolff, Belfast on 29 September 1943. It arrived at Clayton & Davie, Dunston for breaking up in March 1962.
