= Privet (disambiguation) =

Privet is a flowering plant in the genus Ligustrum.

Privet may also refer to:

- HMS Privet, several ships of the British Royal Navy
- SS Privet, a ship in the List of shipwrecks in December 1940
- Privet, along with velcom, trademarks of the Belarus mobile phone operator A1

== See also ==
- Lawsonia inermis (Egyptian privet), the henna plant
- Mock privet (Phillyrea), a genus of two species of flowering plants in the family Oleaceae
- Privet Drive, a fictional road in the Harry Potter universe
- Preved, a meme in the Russian-speaking Internet (a deliberate misspelling of privet)
- Privett (disambiguation)
- Privet (Russian: привет), a greeting in Russian
