= Little Ship Club =

London yacht club

Coordinates: 51.5096°N 0.0924°W

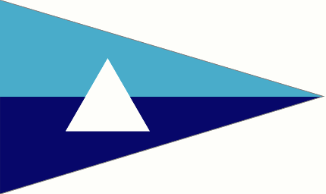
- Burgee

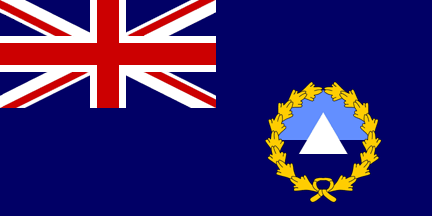
- Ensign
- Short name: LSC
- Founded: 1926
- Location: London, United Kingdom
- Website: Official website

The Little Ship Club is a yacht club in London. It was founded in 1926 by a group of yachtsmen for the purpose of providing training and lectures over the winter months. The club operates from its riverside clubhouse at Bell Wharf on the River Thames, and is the only one operating from within the City of London.

== History ==
The club's inaugural meeting was at The Ship restaurant in London on 5 November 1926. Notable founder members included Claud Worth, Maurice Griffiths, and Higley Halliday. The training function of the club was so successful that, by 1936, they were training members of the Royal Naval Supplementary Volunteer Reserve Force (RNSVR). As a result, the First Sea Lord invited the club to apply for a defaced Blue Ensign. This is the only known instance of such an invitation being made. The close link with the RNSVR led to Little Ship Club members taking part in the World War II evacuation of Dunkirk in which the military commandeered hundreds of private "little" ships to bring troops from land to larger navy vessels that could not pull in close to shore. The club still includes what is possibly one of the original Dunkirk Little Ships, Sheemaun. Two defaced Blue Ensigns that were recovered from the beach at Dunkirk are displayed at the club.

The club moved to the Old Ship tavern in 1928, and from there to Beaver Hall in 1932, as member numbers expanded. In 1962, the club moved to Bell Wharf Lane.

Sir Robin Knox-Johnston, the first yachtsman to complete a non-stop, single-handed circumnavigation, became club president in 1995. There are also two Honorary Life Vice-Presidents: Dr Jean Plancke, Commander of the Legion of Honour, and Norman Hummerstone MBE. Hummerstone was honoured with an MBE in 2001 for his work with the Little Ship Club and was awarded an RYA Lifetime Commitment award by Princess Anne in 2007.

In early 2017, it was announced that, following the retiral of Sir Robin Knox-Johnston, Mike Golding would take on the role of Club President.

The 2021 Commodore is Barrie Martin.

== Training ==
The Little Ship Club is an official RYA training centre. They offer shorebased RYA courses from their London premises including Day Skipper Theory and Yachtmaster Theory.

== Cruising ==
The club has two cruising bases, one on the East Coast of England, and one on the South Coast, centred around the Solent. Both cruising centres have participated in the Calais Rally each year on the weekend of the Spring Bank Holiday since 1929, except when not possible during wartime. The rally is attended by HMS Puncher in recognition of the club's relationship with the University Royal Naval Unit in London.

The club holds a biannual joint rally with The Corinthians club, a reciprocal club based in the USA that was modeled along the same lines as the Little Ship Club. It is held alternately in the US and in the UK, or nearby cruising grounds.

== Racing ==
The club organizes an informal Fast Cruise series around the Solent from October to March. These monthly events are timed cruises with a relaxed, social atmosphere.

They are also joint organisers, with Erith Yacht Club, of the Thames Trafalgar Race. This is a two-leg event from Greenwich to Erith, with a return the next day. It is generally held in October close to Trafalgar Day. The Knox-Johnston Cup, named for Sir Robin Knox-Johnston, is awarded to the highest placed yacht club.

== See also ==
- Dunkirk evacuation
- National Historic Ships
- Vertue (yacht)
