= HMS Plucky (1916) =

British M-Class destroyer, WW1

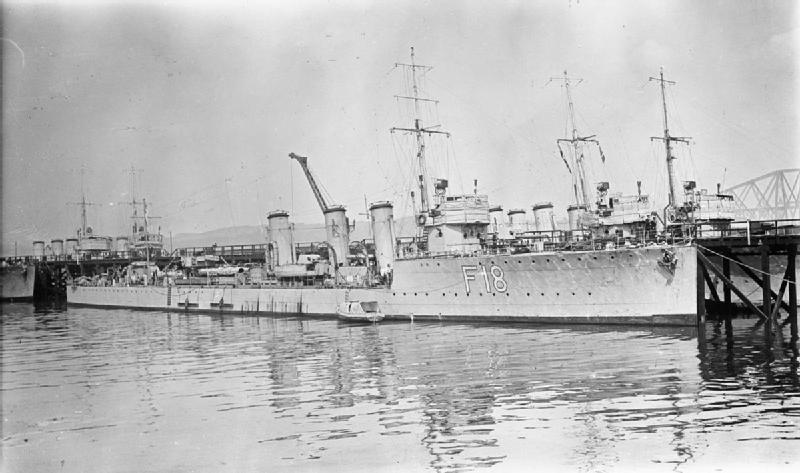
- Sister ship Paladin

History

United Kingdom
- Name: HMS Plucky
- Builder: Scotts of Greenock
- Yard number: 474
- Laid down: May 1915
- Launched: 21 April 1916
- Completed: 4 July 1916
- Out of service: 9 May 1921
- Fate: Sold to be broken up at Briton Ferry

General characteristics
- Class & type: Admiralty M-class destroyer
- Displacement: 994 long tons (1,010 t) normal; 1,025 long tons (1,041 t) full load
- Length: 265 ft (80.8 m)
- Beam: 26 ft 8 in (8.1 m)
- Draught: 9 ft 3 in (2.82 m)
- Propulsion: 3 Yarrow boilers; 2 Brown-Curtis steam turbines, 25,000 shp (19,000 kW)
- Speed: 34 knots (39.1 mph; 63.0 km/h)
- Range: 3,450 nmi (6,390 km) at 15 kn (28 km/h)
- Complement: 76
- Armament: 3 × QF 4-inch (102 mm) Mark IV guns (3×1); 1 × single 2-pounder (40-mm) "pom-pom" Mk. II anti-aircraft gun (1×1); 4 × 21 in (533 mm) torpedo tubes (2×2)

HMS Plucky was an Admiralty M-class destroyer which served with the Royal Navy during the First World War. The M class were an improvement on the previous L-class, capable of higher speed. Launched on 21 April 1916 by Scotts of Greenock, the vessel served as part of the Grand Fleet, spending most of the war based out of Plymouth, apart from a brief sojourn working from the Irish port of Buncrana. Plucky was mainly involved in anti-submarine warfare and escorting the merchant ships that made up the convoys travelling to and from England, colliding with one, the collier Mervin in February 1917. The merchant vessel was unharmed, but the subsequent explosion put the destroyer temporarily out of action. After armistice, the destroyer was redeployed to Portsmouth until being decommissioned and sold to be broken up on 9 May 1921.

== Design and development ==
Plucky was one of sixteen Admiralty M-class destroyers ordered by the British Admiralty in May 1915 as part of the Fifth War Construction Programme. The M-class was an improved version of the earlier L-class destroyers, required to reach a higher speed in order to counter rumoured German fast destroyers. It transpired that the German ships did not exist but the greater performance was appreciated by the navy. The vessels ordered as part of the fifth programme differed from earlier members of the class in having a raking stem and are sometimes known as the Repeat M class.

The destroyer was 265 feet (80.8 m) long overall, with a beam of 26 ft 8 in (8.1 m) and a draught of 9 ft 3 in (2.8 m). Displacement was 994 long tons (1,010 t) normal and 1,025 long tons (1,041 t) full load. Power was provided by three Yarrow boilers feeding two Brown-Curtis steam turbines rated at 25,000 shaft horsepower (19,000 kW) and driving two shafts, to give a design speed of 34 kn (63 km/h; 39 mph). Three funnels were fitted. The ship carried 296 long tons (301 t) of fuel oil, giving a design range of 3,450 nautical miles (6,390 km; 3,970 mi) at 15 knots (28 km/h; 17 mph), and had a complement of 76 officers and ratings.

Armament consisted of three 4 in (102 mm) Mk IV QF guns on the ship's centreline, with one on the forecastle, one aft on a raised platform and one between the middle and aft funnels. A single 2-pounder (40 mm) pom-pom anti-aircraft gun was carried, while torpedo armament consisted of two twin mounts for 21 in (533 mm) torpedoes.

== Construction and career ==
Plucky was laid down by Scotts Shipbuilding and Engineering Company of Greenock with the yard number 474 in May 1915, launched on 21 April the following year and completed on 4 July. The ship was the third of the name to serve with the navy. The previous holder of the name was renamed Banterer before the destroyer was launched. The vessel was deployed as part of the Grand Fleet, joining the Fourteenth Destroyer Flotilla.

The vessel was initially based at Plymouth and, in January 1917, Plucky was allocated to anti-submarine warfare. following reports of increased submarine activity off the coast of Cornwall. The destroyer, along with sister ship Orestes, was sent to hunt for the German intruders. Although no submarines were sunk, neither were any merchant ships. However, while on duty on 20 February, Plucky collided with the collier Mervin off Lizard Point. Although the merchant ship was unharmed, the impact cut off the destroyer's stern and detonated depth charges, which put the ship out of action for a short time. Plucky was subsequently transferred to the Northern Division of the operations out of Ireland, based at Buncrana. The destroyer was deployed to escort convoys travelling from the United States. The service was later extended to cover inward and outward convoys from other locations, including Halifax and Sydney. The ship returned to Plymouth for 1918.

After the armistice, Plucky was allocated to Portsmouth to join the local defence flotilla, operating as part of the First Destroyer Flotilla . However, within a few years, the Royal Navy was required to return to a peacetime level of mobilisation and the destroyer fleet was reduced dramatically. On 9 May 1921, the vessel was sold to Thos. W. Ward of Briton Ferry and broken up.

== Pennant numbers ==
Pennant number	Date
G67	1915
G68	1917
GA6	1918
D2A	1918
