= HMS Plymouth =

Nine ships of the Royal Navy have been named HMS Plymouth after the port of Plymouth in Devon:

- English ship Plymouth (1653) was a 60-gun ship launched in 1653. She was rebuilt in 1705 with 64 guns, but foundered later that year.
- HMS Plymouth (1689) was a sheer hulk purchased in 1689 and broken up in 1730.
- HMS Plymouth (1708) was a 60-gun fourth rate launched in 1708. She was rebuilt in 1722 and broken up in 1764.
- HMS Plymouth (1755) was a 6-gun yacht launched in 1755 and broken up in 1793.
- HMS Plymouth (1778) was a transport launched in 1778 and sunk as a breakwater in 1815.
- HMS Plymouth (1786) was an 8-gun transport built in 1786 and sold in 1815.
- HMS Plymouth (1796) was an 8-gun yacht launched in 1796 and broken up in 1830.
- HMS Plymouth was a yacht launched in 1814 as HMS Admiralty, renamed HMS Plymouth in 1830, used on harbour service and renamed YC 1 from 1866, and was sold in 1870.
- HMS Plymouth (F126) was a Rothesay-class frigate launched in 1959. She was paid off in 1988 and preserved as a museum ship at Birkenhead until 2014, then sold for scrap.

== Battle honours ==
- Porto Farina, 1655
- Santa Cruz, 1657
- Lowestoft, 1665
- Four Days' Battle, 1666
- Orfordness, 1666
- Sole Bay, 1672
- Texel, 1673
- Barfleur, 1692
- Falklands, 1982

== See also ==
- HMS Plym
- HMS Plymouth Prize
- HMS Plymouth Transport
- USS Plymouth
