= HMS Pandora =

Ten ships of the Royal Navy have been named HMS Pandora after the mythological Pandora. Another was planned, but the name was reassigned to another ship:

- HMS Pandora (1779), a 24-gun Porcupine-class sixth rate launched in 1779. She was sent to capture the Bounty mutineers in 1790 and ran aground in 1791 on the Great Barrier Reef, Queensland.
- HMS Pandora (1780) was the French 14-gun brig Pandour, launched in 1780, that the British captured in 1795 and renamed HMS Pandora; she foundered in the North Sea in 1797.
- HMS Pandora (1806), an 18-gun Cruizer-class brig-sloop launched in 1806 and wrecked in 1811 off the Skaw with the loss 27 men to exposure.
- HMS Pandora, to have been another 18-gun Cruizer-class brig-sloop. She was ordered in 1812, renamed HMS Lynx later that year, and was cancelled in 1818.
- HMS Pandora (1813), an 18-gun Cruizer-class brig-sloop launched in 1813, converted to a ship-sloop in 1825, put up for sale in 1827 and sold in 1831.
- HMS Pandora (1833), a 3-gun packet brig launched in 1833. She became a survey ship, then a coastguard watchvessel in 1857 and was sold in 1862.
- HMS Pandora (1859), a Philomel-class wooden gunboat launched in 1859 and sold in 1875 for use as an Arctic expedition ship. She was sold to American explorers in 1878, renamed Jeannette and sunk by ice in 1881.
- HMS Pandora, a Pearl-class armoured cruiser launched in 1889, renamed HMS Katoomba in 1890 and sold in 1906.
- HMS Pandora (1900), a Pelorus-class armoured cruiser launched in 1900 and scrapped in 1913.
- HMS Pandora (1914), a depot ship, formerly the civilian Seti. She was renamed HMS Dolphin in 1924 and was sunk by a mine in 1939.
- HMS Pandora (N42), a Parthian-class submarine launched in 1929 and sunk at Valletta, Malta in 1942. She was raised in 1943 and broken up in 1957.

== See also ==
- HMS Pandour
- To the Ends of the Earth, a trilogy of novels by William Golding set aboard a fictitious HMS Pandora
