= HMS Orestes =

Several ships of the Royal Navy have carried the name HMS Orestes, after the mythical son of Agamemnon, who avenged his father's murder:

- HMS Orestes (1781) was a Dutch-built brig-sloop. She was captured from the Dutch in 1781, taken into Royal Navy service, and disappeared in the Indian Ocean in 1799.
- HMS Orestes (1803) was a ship sloop of 14 guns, purchased in 1803; her crew burnt her in 1805 to prevent the enemy capturing her.
- HMS Orestes (1805) was a Seagull-class brig-sloop of 16 guns, launched in 1805 and sold in 1817.
- HMS Orestes (1824) was a sloop, launched on 31 May 1824 and converted into a coal depot in 1852.
- HMS Orestes (1860) was a Jason-class corvette, launched on 18 August 1860 and scrapped in 1866.
- HMS Orestes (1916), an Admiralty M-class destroyer, launched in 1916 and sold for scrap in 1921.
- HMS Orestes (J277) was an Algerine-class minesweeper, sunk as a target in Seacat missile trials.
