= HMS Prospero =

Three ships of the British Royal Navy have been named Prospero for the Shakespearean character Prospero:

- HMS Prospero (1803) was launched in 1800 at Shields as the merchant vessel Albion. The Royal Navy purchased her in 1803 and named her Prospero. She was wrecked with the loss of most of her crew in 1807.
- HMS Prospero (1809) was a Crocus-class brig-sloop launched in 1809. She captured a handful of small vessels, including one privateer. The Navy sold her in 1816 for breaking up.
- HMS Prospero (1837) was the mercantile paddle steamer Belfast, launched at Port Glasgow in 1829. The Royal Navy purchased her in 1837 and renamed her Prospero. She was broken up in 1866.
