= Oiseaux =

Oiseaux (French for 'Birds') may refer to:

== Literature ==
- Les Oiseaux, a 1960 book by Jacques Berlioz
- Oiseaux, an 1892 book by Émile Deyrolle
- Oiseaux, a 1963 poetry collection by Saint-John Perse

== Music ==
- Les Oiseaux, a 1983 album by Greta De Reyghere
- Les Oiseaux, a 1992 album by Têtes Raides
- "Oiseaux", a 2016 song by Mr. Oizo from All Wet
- "Les Oiseaux", a 2019 song by Pomme from Les Failles

== Visual arts ==
- Les Oiseaux, a 1937 sculpture by Lucien Brasseur
- Les Oiseaux, a 1991 painting by Nadir Afonso

== See also ==
- Oiseau (disambiguation)
