= HMS Olympia =

At least two ships of the Royal Navy have been named HMS Olympia after Olympia, Greece:

- HMS Olympia (1806), launched in 1806, was a schooner. She was sold in 1815.
- HMS Olympia (FY1586), launched in 1917, was a trawler purchased from civilian service in 1939, and returned in 1945.

== See also ==
- USS Olympia
- HMS Olympus
- RMS Olympic
