= The Poppies =

The Poppies may refer to:

In music bands:

- The Poppies (American band)
- The Poppies (Welsh band)
- Les Poppys ("The Poppys"), French band
- Pop Will Eat Itself, sometimes referred to as The Poppies

In football teams:

- Bournemouth F.C., nicknamed The Poppies
- Kettering Town F.C., nicknamed The Poppies

== See also ==
- Poppies (disambiguation)
- Tall Poppies Records
