= French ship Pomone =

Several ships of the French Navy have borne the name Pomone, after the Roman goddess Pomona:

- French frigate Pomone (1750), a 30-gun frigate, burnt to avoid capture in 1760.
- French transport Pomone (1770), a requisitioned transport ship, sold in 1771.
- French frigate Pomone (1785), a 40-gun frigate, captured during the action of 23 April 1794 by captured by HMS Arethusa and taken into service as HMS Pomone. She was sold in 1802 and broken up in 1803.
- French frigate Pomone (1805), a 44-gun frigate, captured during the action of 29 November 1811 by HMS Alceste and Active and taken into service as HMS Ambuscade. She was broken up in 1812.
- French corvette Pomone (1821), a 28-gun corvette
- French frigate Pomone (1845), a steam frigate

== See also ==
- HMS Pomone
