= HMS Oxford =

Two ships of the Royal Navy have borne the name HMS Oxford, after the city of Oxford:

- English ship Oxford (1656) was a 26-gun fifth-rate ship launched at Deptford in 1656. The ship was given to Colonel Sir Thomas Modyford, the Governor of Jamaica, in March 1667 and, under command of Sir Henry Morgan, was blown up by accident somewhere off Île à Vache, off the coast of Haïti in 1669.
- HMS Oxford (1674) was a 54-gun fourth-rate ship launched in 1674. She was rebuilt in 1702, and again in 1727 when she was rearmed to 50 guns. The vessel was broken up in 1758.

== See also ==
- HMS Oxford Castle (K692) was a Castle-class corvette launched in 1943 and scrapped in 1960.
