= USS Plymouth =

USS Plymouth may refer to the following ships operated by the United States Navy:

- USS Plymouth (1844), a sloop-of-war, was part of Commodore Matthew Perry's Black Fleet
- USS Plymouth (1867), a wooden-hulled, screw sloop-of-war, was commissioned as Kenosha and served just after the American Civil War
- USS Plymouth (SP-3308), a screw steamer, transported materiel to France during World War I
- USS Plymouth (PG-57), a patrol gunboat, was lost during World War II.

== See also ==
- USS Plymouth Rock (LSD-29)
- HMS Plymouth
