= HMS Pigeon =

Several vessels of the Royal Navy have borne the name HMS Pigeon.

- HMS Pigeon (1805) was the ex-mercantile Fanny, purchased in May 1805 and fitted and armed as a dispatch cutter. She was wrecked three quarters of a mile from the town of Rysum in East Friesland in November 1805 through the inexperience of her pilot.
- HMS Pigeon (1806) was a Cuckoo-class schooner launched in 1806 and wrecked off Margate in 1809.
- Pigeon: See HMS Variable (1827).
- HMS Pigeon (1854) was the mercantile wood paddle tender Brothers purchased at Constantinople in 1854 and sold there in 1856.
- HMS Pigeon (1860) was a wood screw Britomart-class gunboat built in 1860 and broken up in 1876.
- HMS Pigeon (1888) was a composite screw gunboat built in 1888 and sold in 1906.
- HMS Pigeon (1916) was an Admiralty M-class destroyer built in 1916 and sold in 1921.
