= HMS Polyanthus =

Two ships of the Royal Navy have been named HMS Polyanthus after the flower:

- HMS Polyanthus (1917) was an Aubrietia-class sloop of World War I
- HMS Polyanthus (K47) was a Flower-class corvette of World War II
