= HMS Poulette =

Two vessels of the Royal Navy have borne the name HMS Poulette, after the French diminutive for the hen of the chicken:

- HMS Poulette was a French 20-gun corvette launched in 1781. The British captured her at Toulon in 1793 and took her into service. She was at the Battle of Genoa (1795) but the British burned her in October 1796 at Ajaccio.
- HMS Poulette (1799) was the French 20-gun privateer Foudroyant, built and launched at Bordeaux in 1798. The British captured her in 1799 but had her laid up. She served the Royal Navy for about a year and a half until she was again laid up in 1805. She was sold in 1814.
