= HMS Oracle =

Two ships of the Royal Navy have been named HMS Oracle:

- HMS Oracle (1915), an Admiralty M-class destroyer launched in December 1915 and sold in October 1921.
- HMS Oracle (S16), an Oberon-class submarine launched in 1961 and paid off in 1993.
