= HMS Paladin =

Several ships of the Royal Navy have borne the name HMS Paladin:

- HMS Paladin (1914) was a tender-tug hired as a rescue tug between 1914 and 1919; she was renamed Paladin II in 1916 when the destroyer was commissioned
- HMS Paladin (1916) was an Admiralty M-class destroyer in commission 1916 - 1921
- HMS Paladin (G69) was a P-class destroyer and later a Type 16 frigate, in commission 1941 - 1962
