= HMS Olympus =

Two ships of the Royal Navy have borne the name HMS Olympus:

- HMS Olympus (N35) was an Odin-class submarine launched in 1928 and sunk in 1942.
- HMS Olympus (S12) was an Oberon-class submarine launched in 1961. She was decommissioned in 1989 and transferred to the Royal Canadian Navy as a training ship. She was put up for disposal in 2002.

== See also ==
- HMS Olympia
