= HMS Orontes =

Four ships of the Royal Navy have borne the name HMS Orontes:

- HMS Orontes (1813) was a 36-gun fifth rate, built as HMS Brilliant but renamed HMS Orontes in 1812 and launched in 1813. She was broken up in 1817.
- HMS Orontes (1862) was an iron screw troopship launched in 1862 and sold for breaking up in 1893.
- HMS Orontes was the former Swiftsure-class ironclad HMS Swiftsure. Swiftsure was renamed Orontes when reduced to harbour service in 1904, and was sold in 1908.
- HMS Orontes was a depot ship, the former Belleisle-class ironclad HMS Orion. Orion was renamed Orontes in 1909 and sold in 1913.
