= HMS Pincher =

Seven ships of the Royal Navy have borne the name HMS Pincher:

- HMS Pincher (1797) was a 12-gun gunvessel, also known as Gunboat No. 39. She was previously the civilian Two Sisters. She was purchased in 1797 and sold in 1802.
- HMS Pincher (1804) was a 12-gun gunbrig launched in 1804 and sold in 1816.
- HMS Pincher (1827) was a 5-gun schooner launched in 1827. She capsized in 1838, and was subsequently raised and sold that year.
- HMS Pincher (1854) was a Gleaner-class wooden screw gunboat launched in 1854 and broken up by 1864.
- HMS Pincher (1879) was an Ant-class iron screw gunboat launched in 1879 and sold in 1905.
- HMS Pincher (1910) was a Beagle-class destroyer launched in 1910 and wrecked in 1918.
- HMS Pincher (J294) was an Algerine-class minesweeper launched in 1943 and scrapped in 1962.
