= HMS Pelican =

Sixteen ships of the Royal Navy have been named HMS Pelican, after the bird, while another was planned:

- Pelican was an 18-gun privateer. She was part of Sir Francis Drake's global circumnavigation expedition in 1577 and was renamed Golden Hind in 1578. It is unlikely that she was ever commissioned in the Royal Navy.
- English ship Pelican (1626) was a ship captured in 1626 and sold in 1629.
- English ship Pelican (1646) was a 10-gun ship in Royalist service between 1646 and 1648 during the English Civil War.
- English ship Pelican (1650) was a 38-gun ship launched in 1650 and burnt by accident in 1656.
- HMS Pelican (1757) was a 16-gun sloop, previously in civilian service as St George. She was purchased in 1757 and sold in 1763.
- HMS Pelican (1775) was a 10-gun schooner, originally a French privateer. She was captured in 1775 and assigned to harbour duties in 1776. She was renamed Earl of Denbigh in 1777 and sank in 1787.
- HMS Pelican was the American Bermuda-built sloop Adriana of 150 tons (bm), that the British captured in 1777 and took into service to replace her predecessor.
- HMS Pelican (1777) was a 24-gun sixth-rate Porcupine-class post ship launched in 1777. She foundered in 1781.
- HMS Pelican (1781) was a 16-gun brig-sloop, originally the French privateer Frédéric. HMS Emerald captured her in 1781; Pelican was sold in 1783.
- HMS Pelican (1795) was an 18-gun sloop launched in 1795 and sold in 1806.
- HMS Pelican (1806) was a 16-gun brig-sloop, previously the French navy brig Voltigeur. She was captured in 1806 by HMS Pique and was sold in 1812.
- HMS Pelican (1812) was an 18-gun Cruizer-class brig-sloop launched in 1812. She was reassigned as a customs watchvessel in 1847 and was renamed WV 29 in 1863, finally being sold in 1865.
- HMS Pelican (1860) was a wooden Camelion-class screw sloop launched in 1860 and sold into civilian service in 1867 and renamed Hawk. She was resold to the Portuguese Navy and renamed Infanta Dom Henrique.
- HMS Pelican (1877) was a composite screw Osprey-class sloop launched in 1877. She was sold to the Hudson's Bay Company as a supply ship in 1901 and was scuttled in 1953.
- HMS Pelican (1906) was tender, previously the War Department vessel Sir J. Jones. She was transferred to the Royal Navy in 1906. She was renamed HMS Petulant in 1916 and was sold in 1927.
- HMS Pelican (1916) was an M-class destroyer launched in 1916 and sold in 1921 and broken up in 1924.
- HMS Pelican (L86) was an Egret-class sloop launched in 1938 and broken up in 1958.
- HMS Pelican was to have been a survey vessel, but she was cancelled in 1967.

== See also ==
HMS Pelican Prize
