= HMS Pendennis =

Two vessels of the Royal Navy have been named HMS Pendennis:

- HMS Pendennis (1679) was a 70-gun third-rate launched in 1679 and wrecked in 1689
- HMS Pendennis (1695) was a 48-gun fourth-rate launched in 1695 and captured by the French 50-gun Protée in 1705
