= Privett (surname) =

Privett is an English locational surname, for someone from Privett, Hampshire, England.

== Notable people with this name include ==
- Cami Privett (born 1993), American soccer player
- Darrell Privett, British TV personality
- Frank Privett (1874–1937), British Conservative Party politician, Member of Parliament 1922–1923
- John Privett (fl. 2009–2018), Canadian archbishop
- Stephen Privett (born 1942), Roman Catholic priest and president of the University of San Francisco
