= USS Olympia =

USS Olympia may refer to:

- USS Olympia (C-6) is a protected cruiser in active service from 1895 to 1922, most notably in the Spanish–American War, and presently a museum ship in Philadelphia
- USS Olympia (SSN-717) is a Los Angeles-class nuclear attack submarine commissioned in 1984 and currently not in service

== See also ==
- USS Olympic
