= HMAS Queenborough =

1942 Q and R-class destroyer

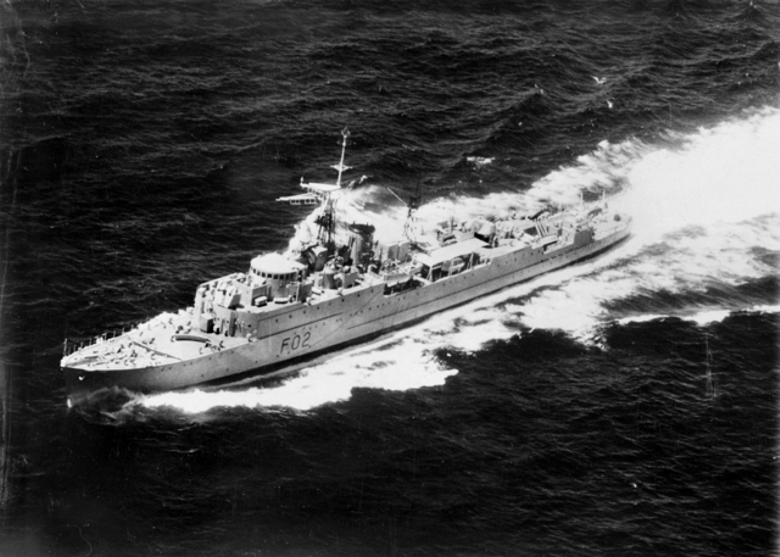
- HMAS Queenborough in 1954, after conversion to an anti-submarine frigate

History

United Kingdom
- Name: Queenborough
- Namesake: Town of Queenborough
- Builder: Swan Hunter and Wigham Richardson at Wallsend-on-Tyne
- Cost: £725,000
- Laid down: 6 November 1940
- Launched: 16 January 1942
- Commissioned: 15 September 1942
- Completed: 10 December 1942
- Decommissioned: September 1945
- Honours and awards: Battle honours: Arctic 1942–43; Sicily 1943; Salerno 1943; Mediterranean 1943; Okinawa 1945
- Fate: Transferred to Royal Australian Navy

Australia
- Commissioned: September 1945
- Recommissioned: 7 December 1954
- Decommissioned: 10 July 1963
- Recommissioned: 28 July 1966
- Decommissioned: 7 April 1972
- Reclassified: Anti-submarine frigate (1954); Training ship (1966)
- Motto: "Seek And Slay"
- Nickname(s): Queenbee; Fighting 57
- Honours and awards: Battle honours: Malaya 1957
- Fate: Sold for scrap

General characteristics (as launched)
- Class & type: Q-class destroyer
- Displacement: 2020 tons
- Length: 358 feet and 9 Inches (109.99m)
- Beam: 35 feet 9 inches (10.6m)
- Draught: 9.5 ft (2.9 m)
- Speed: 36 Knots (66.672 kmh)
- Range: 4,680 nautical miles (8,670 km) at 20 knots (37 km/h)
- Armament: 4 × single 4.7 inch QF guns; 1 × quadruple QF 2-pounder pom-pom; 6 × Oerlikon 20 mm cannons; 2 × 4 torpedo tubes firing 21 inch (533 mm) torpedoes; 4 × depth-charge throwers

General characteristics (post conversion)
- Type: Modified Type 15 frigate
- Draught: 15.5 ft (4.7 m)
- Propulsion: Parsons geared turbines 2 x shafts
- Range: 4,040 nautical miles (7,480 km) at 16 knots (30 km/h)
- Armament: 1 × twin 4-inch HA/LA gun; 1 × twin Bofors 40 mm gun; 1 × Limbo anti-submarine mortar
- Notes: Other characteristics as above

HMAS Queenborough (G70/D270/F02/57) (originally HMS Queenborough (G70/D19)) was a Q-class destroyer that served in the Royal Navy (RN) and Royal Australian Navy (RAN).

Constructed during World War II as part of the War Emergency Programme, Queenborough was laid down in 1940 and launched in 1942, serving in the Arctic, Mediterranean, and Pacific theatres. After the war ended, the ship was transferred on loan to the RAN in exchange for an N-class destroyer, then given to Australia as a gift in 1950.

Queenborough was converted to an anti-submarine frigate, and served with the RAN until 1966. During this time, she was deployed to the Far East Strategic Reserve on multiple occasions, participated in numerous fleet exercises, and took on a partial training role. She was decommissioned and placed in reserve, but reactivated in 1969 as a training ship. Queenborough remained in service for another three years, until a series of mechanical and structural faults required that she be retired, decommissioning in 1972 and being scrapped in Hong Kong in 1975.

== Design and construction ==
The sixth RN ship to be named after the town of Queenborough in Kent, England, Queenborough was laid down by Swan Hunter and Wigham Richardson at Wallsend-on-Tyne on 6 November 1940. She was launched on 16 January 1942, commissioned into the RN on 15 September, and completed on 10 December. She cost £725,000 to complete.

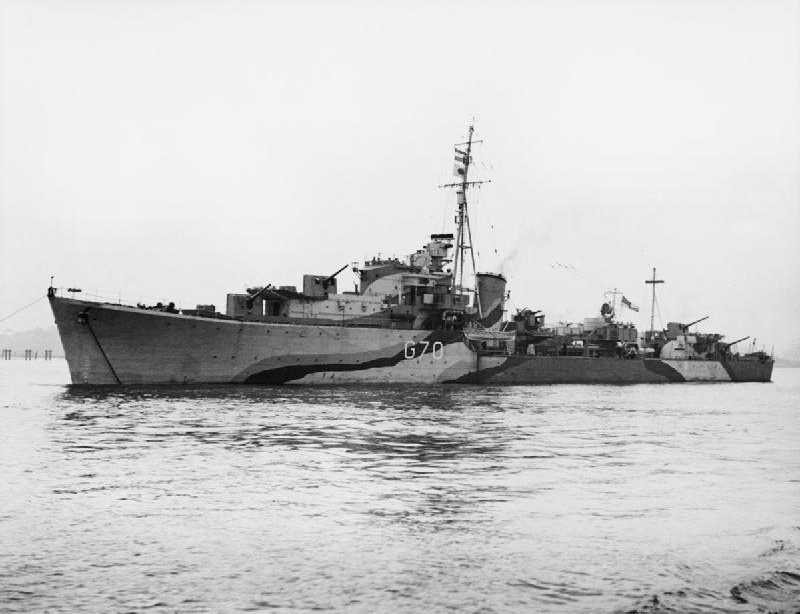
HMS Queenborough, shortly after her 1942 commissioning

The main armament for Queenborough consisted of four single 4.7-inch QF Mark IX guns, two before and two aft of the main superstructure. Secondary weapons included a quadruple-mounting QF 2-pounder Mark VIII pom-pom located just aft of the funnel, and six single Oerlikon 20 mm cannons provided anti-air capability, while eight Mark VIII torpedo tubes (4 forward, 4 aft) firing 21-inch (533 mm) Mark IX torpedoes for anti-ship engagements.

== RN service ==
HMS Queenborough served in the Arctic Ocean, Mediterranean Sea, Indian Ocean, and Pacific Ocean during World War II. She was assigned to the 4th Destroyer Flotilla, which was made up of Q-class destroyers.

=== Arctic convoys ===
Following commissioning, Queenborough was assigned to the British Home Fleet and spent the end of 1942 and the early part of 1943 as an Arctic convoy escort.

On 31 December 1942, Queenborough was one of ten ships taken by Home Fleet commander Admiral Tovey to reinforce the ships covering Arctic convoy JW 51B, following the Battle of the Barents Sea.

She was briefly deployed to the waters off South Africa before the 4th Destroyer Flotilla was assigned to Force H and the Mediterranean theatre in mid-1943.

=== Italian landings ===
Queenborough was involved in numerous Allied landings of the Italian Campaign. She was part of the British covering force for the Allied invasion of Sicily on 10 July. The destroyer was involved in the leadup to the British landings at Calabria from 31 August to 3 September, including preparatory shelling of the landing site on 31 August and 2 September. A week later, she supported the United States troop landings at Salerno, remaining on station until 16 September.

=== British Eastern Fleet ===
The 4th Destroyer Flotilla was ordered to depart the Mediterranean theatre and sail for the Indian Ocean in March 1944, to join the British Eastern Fleet.

Near the end of March, Queenborough commenced involvement in Operation Diplomat. Leaving Trincomalee, on 21 March, the 18-ship fleet practiced refuelling 800 nautical miles (1,500 km) south of Ceylon. On 27 March, the fleet met United States reinforcements—USS Saratoga and three escorts—with the combined force arriving back in Trincomalee on 31 March.

From 16 to 24 April, Queenborough was assigned to Task Force 70 of Operation Cockpit as one of the ships escorting aircraft carriers HMS Illustrious and USS Saratoga. On her return to Trincomalee, the destroyer joined Task Force 66 for Operation Transom, a carrier-based air raid on Surabaya. The task force replenished from tankers at Exmouth Bay on 15 May, before attacking on 17 May. Queenborough returned to Trincomalee on 27 May.

Queenborough departed Trincomalee on 15 October as part of Task Force 63, a British Eastern Fleet operation to focus Japanese attention on the west coast of Malaya as a diversion for American amphibious landings in the Philippines. The diversionary attacks, known as Operation Millet, included a series of bombardments and air raids against Japanese installations and ships in Malacca and Car Nicobar, and were intended to appear as if the Allies were preparing an invasion of Malaya. Queenborough was attached to Group 1, consisting of the battleship HMS Renown and her escorts, and bombarded Car Nicobar on 17 and 18 October. Despite heavy damage to the target areas, Operation Millet failed to attract a significant reaction from the Japanese, as available resources were already en route to defend Leyte from invasion.

=== British Pacific Fleet ===
At the end of 1944, the heavily reinforced British Eastern Fleet was split into two forces, The smaller East Indies Fleet remained in the Indian Ocean, while the larger British Pacific Fleet (BPF) was redeployed to the Pacific Ocean, to increase the British and Commonwealth presence in the war against Japan. Queenborough and the 4th Destroyer Flotilla were assigned to the latter at the end of November 1944. As part of this deployment, ship numbers and designations were changed from the British pennant system to the American hull number system to facilitate operation with the United States Navy; Queenborough's pennant was changed from G70 to D19.

From 23 March to 29 May 1945, Queenborough was part of the escort screen protecting British carriers as their aircraft attacked Japanese airfields in the Ryukyu Islands.

The destroyer received five battle honours for her wartime service: "Arctic 1942–43", "Sicily 1943", "Salerno 1943", "Mediterranean 1943", and "Okinawa 1945".

== Transfer to RAN ==
Following the conclusion of World War II, Queenborough was one of three RN Q-class destroyers transferred to the RAN on loan. Another two had been loaned to the RAN since commissioning. This arrangement allowed the four N-class destroyers loaned to the RAN during the war to be returned. Queenborough was the last ship to commission into the RAN, in September 1945, in trade for HMAS Norman.

=== Frigate conversion ===
In early 1950, the decision was made to convert all five Q-class destroyers in RAN service to anti-submarine warfare frigates, similar to the Type 15 frigate conversions performed on several War Emergency Programme destroyers of the RN. A proposal was made by the Australian government to pay for the upgrade to the five on-loan vessels, at the predicted cost of AU£400,000 each. Instead, the British Admiralty presented the ships to the RAN on 1 June as gifts. The conversions were part of an overall plan to improve the anti-submarine warfare capability of the RAN, although Queenborough and the other ships were only a 'stopgap' measure until purpose-built ASW frigates could be constructed. Queenborough was the second ship to be converted, and was rebuilt as a frigate at Cockatoo Island Dockyard in Sydney. The modernisation began in May 1950, and despite predictions that work would finish within 18 months, Queenborough was not recommissioned until 7 December 1954.

The conversion started with the removal of the ship's entire armament. The entire superstructure was cut off, and replaced with a larger, aluminium construction. The quality of accommodation was improved. Fuel stowage was reduced, in turn cutting the ship's range from 4,680 nautical miles (8,670 km) at 20 knots (37 km/h) to 4,040 nautical miles (7,480 km) at 16 knots (30 km/h). The bridge was enclosed, and a dedicated operations room was installed, in order to coordinate the great quantity and type of data collected by the ship's sensors. Queenborough was fitted with new guns: a twin 4 inch high angle/low angle gun aft of the superstructure, and a twin 40 mm Bofors gun forward of the bridge. The reduction in gun armament was justified by the inclusion of a Limbo anti-submarine mortar.

The conversion resulted in a 315-ton increase in standard displacement. The ship's draught increased from 9.5 feet (2.9 m) to 15.5 feet (4.7 m).

The converted ships were formed as the 1st Australian Frigate Squadron.

== Post-conversion service ==
=== As frigate ===
On 24 February 1955, Queenborough departed Sydney for England, to participate in anti-submarine warfare training with the Royal Navy. After repairs to damage sustained during the journey, Queenborough was assigned to the RN Training Squadron, attached to the Joint Anti-Submarine School in Derry, Northern Ireland. The ship was attached to the 6th Frigate Squadron during this period. In addition to the squadron's badge depicting the Red Hand of Ulster, Queenborough added a red kangaroo design to her funnel to depict the ship's Australian allegiance; one of the earliest instances of using a red kangaroo to identify an Australian warship.

Queenborough was first deployed to the Far East Strategic Reserve in early 1956. After returning to Darwin on 10 April, the ship was made lead vessel of the 1st Frigate Squadron.

Queenborough and sister ship HMAS Quiberon were sent to the Strategic Reserve at the end of January 1959. During the four-month assignment, the ships were assigned to the royal escort of HMY Britannia for the visit of Prince Philip to Singapore, and participated in SEATO Exercise Sea Demon. The frigate returned to Sydney on 16 May 1959.

In October 1962 Queenborough together with HMAS Quiberon rescued 25 survivors from the Panamanian merchant steamer Kawi, which sank after being caught in a storm in the South China Sea. In December 1962, again with HMAS Quiberon, Queenborough rescued the crew of SS Tuscany, which had run aground on a reef in the South China Sea.

On 8 May 1963 Queenborough collided with British submarine HMS Tabard off Jervis Bay during anti-submarine training exercises. Tabard's fin and conning tower were damaged, and minor damage was inflicted to the underside of Queenborough, but both vessels were able to return to Sydney unaided. In September, Queenborough and sister ship Quiberon were deployed to the FESR. On 26 October, the two ships were involved in the rescue of survivors from MV Kawi, The ships visited Calcutta in December, before returning to Hong Kong for Christmas.

In January 1963 Queenborough was replaced as the lead vessel of the 1st Frigate Squadron by HMAS Parramatta. From 31 January to 4 February, Queenborough and Quiberon were in Saigon for a diplomatic visit; they were the last RAN ships to visit Vietnam before Australia's military became involved in the Vietnam War. Following the visit of Queen Elizabeth II to Australia in March and April 1963, Queenborough was stationed between Australia and New Caledonia as a precautionary air-sea rescue ship for the first leg of the Queen's departure flight. Queenborough was decommissioned into reserve on 10 July 1963.

=== As training ship ===
After spending three years in reserve, a need for expanded training capabilities saw Queenborough recommissioned on 28 July 1966 as a dedicated anti-submarine warfare (ASW) training ship. While being prepared for her new duties, the 4-inch guns and gunnery radar were removed (although the turret would remain until early 1968). An improved Type 978 radar was installed.

In October 1966, Queenborough was deployed to Tasmania on a training cruise. An Australian researcher on Macquarie Island required a medical evacuation: as the closest Australian vessel, Queenborough changed course for the island. The ship encountered 9-metre (30 ft) seas, 60-knot (110 km/h) winds, hail, and snow en route, and arrived in time to collect the scientist before worse weather set in.

At the start of 1969, the RAN's ship designation and numbering system was changed from the British system to the US system. Queenborough was reclassified as a destroyer escort, and received the number 57 (without any prefix letter). The similarity of the new number to the "57 Varieties" advertising slogan of the H. J. Heinz Company, led to a relationship between the ship and the Australian branch of the company.

On 22 July 1969, Queenborough completed her 400,000th nautical mile of sailing since launching.

On 16 April 1970, Queenborough was part of a 45-ship, 13-nation fleet assembled in Sydney Harbour as part of the Australian Bicentenary celebrations.

In June 1971, Queenborough left Sydney to visit Fiji, Samoa, and New Zealand. Heavy weather between Fiji and New Zealand created cracks in the bow. These were detected in New Zealand waters, with Queenborough docking in Auckland until 5 July for repairs.

== Decommissioning and fate ==
Queenborough was decommissioned on 7 April 1972. Tenders for purchase of the ship closed in February 1975, and on 8 April 1975 Queenborough was sold to Willtop (Asia) Ltd. The ship was towed to Hong Kong, arriving on 20 June, to be broken up for scrap.

Following an overhaul of the RAN battle honours system, completed in March 2010, Queenborough was retroactively awarded the honour "Malaya 1957" for her service during the Malayn Emergency.
