= HMS Pert =

Four ships of the Royal Navy have been named HMS Pert:

- HMS Pert (1804), a brig sloop, formerly the French privateer Bonaparte captured in 1804. She was wrecked in 1807.
- HMS Pert (1808), a brig sloop, formerly the French Serpent captured in 1808. She was broken up in 1813.
- HMS Pert (1856), a Cheerful-class gunboat launched in 1856 and broken up in 1864.
- HMS Pert (1868), a Beacon-class gunvessel launched in 1868 and sold in 1888.
