= HMS Petunia =

Two ships of the Royal Navy have been named HMS Petunia :

- HMS Petunia (1916) an Arabis-class sloop launched in 1916 and sold in 1922
- HMS Petunia (K79) a Flower-class corvette launched in 1940 and transferred to the Republic of China Navy as Fu Po in 1946; she was sunk in the following year
