= HMS Prevost =

HMS Prevost

- HMS Prevost was a 12-gun schooner purchased in 1803 in the Leeward Islands; on 31 August 1806 the French privateer Austerlitz captured her.

== See also ==
- HMS Sir George Prevost, later HMS Wolfe and then HMS Montreal
- HMS Lady Prevost, later USS Lady Prevost
- HMCS Prevost, a Canadian Naval Reserve unit
