= HMS Opal =

There have been two ships of the Royal Navy named HMS Opal:

- HMS Opal (1875), an Emerald-class steam corvette launched in 1875 and sold for scrap in 1891.
- HMS Opal (1915), an Admiralty M-class destroyer launched in 1915 and wrecked in the North Sea in 1918.
