= HMS Pheasant =

Seven ships of the British Royal Navy have been named HMS Pheasant:

- HMS Pheasant (1761), a 14-gun sloop. Originally French (Faisan), captured April 1761 by HMS Albany. Foundered in the English Channel in October 1761.
- HMS Pheasant (1778), a 12-gun cutter armed with 12 × 4-pounder guns. Bought in 1778. Capsized in the English Channel on 20 June 1781.
- HMS Pheasant (1798), an 18-gun sloop by Edwards of Shoreham, launched 17 April 1798. Sold on 11 July 1827.
- HMS Pheasant (1856), an Albacore-class 4-gun, wooden screw gunboat by W & H Pitcher of Northfleet launched on 1 May 1856. She took part in the Royal Fleet Review of 23 April 1856 and was broken up in August 1877 at Northfleet.
- HMS Pheasant (1888), a 6-gun, composite screw gunboat built at Devonport Dockyard, launched on 10 April 1888. Armed with 6 × 4 in guns. Sold on 15 May 1906.
- HMS Pheasant (1916), an Admiralty M-class destroyer built by Fairfield, launched 23 October 1916. Sunk by a mine off Orkney on 1 March 1917.
- HMS Pheasant (U49), a Black Swan-class sloop launched in December 1942.
