= HMS Queenborough =

Six ships of the Royal Navy have been named HMS Queenborough, after the town of Queenborough in Kent. One of these ships was later transferred to the Royal Australian Navy as HMAS Queenborough.

- HMS Queenborough (1671), a yacht built at Chatham Dockyard in 1671. She was rebuilt at Sheerness Dockyard in 1718, and was sold on 11 July 1771.
- HMS Queenborough (1694), a sixth rate of 24 guns, launched at Sheerness Dockyard in 1694. She was rebuilt at Portsmouth Dockyard in 1709, and sold on 20 August 1719.
- HMS Queenborough (1744), a fifth rate of 44 guns, launched at Portsmouth Dockyard on 7 December 1709 as HMS Fowey. She was renamed Queenborough on 5 November 1744, and sold in 1746.
- HMS Queenborough (1747), a sixth rate of 24 guns, launched by Sparrow of Rotherhithe on 21 January 1747. She was one of five vessels lost in a cyclone off Pondicherry on 1 January 1761
- HMS Queenborough (1800), a cutter of 12 guns serving from 1800 to 1806.
- HMS Queenborough (G70), a Q-class destroyer launched by Swan Hunter and Wigham Richardson Ltd in 1942, and transferred to the Royal Australian Navy in 1945.

== Battle honours ==
Eight battle honours have been awarded to ships named HMS Queenborough. These battle honours are earned by an individual ship, and inherited by subsequent ships of the name.

- Sadras 1758
- Negapatam 1758
- Porto Novo 1759
- Arctic 1942–43
- Sicily 1943
- Salerno 1943
- Mediterranean 1943
- Okinawa 1945
