= HMS Quail =

Six ships of the Royal Navy have been named HMS Quail after the quail.

- HMS Quail (1806) was a 4-gun schooner launched in 1806 and sold into mercantile service in 1816. She was last listed in 1816.
- HMS Quail (1817) was a cutter tender launched in 1817. There were plans to rename her HMS Providence in 1822, but this never happened, and she was broken up by 1829.
- HMS Quail (1830) was a 4-gun cutter launched 1830 and fitted out for the Liberian government in 1859.
- HMS Quail (1856) was an Albacore-class wood screw gunboat launched in 1856 and broken up in 1861.
- HMS Quail (1895) was a Quail-class destroyer launched in 1895. She was reclassified as a B-class destroyer in 1913 and was sold for scrap in 1919.
- HMS Quail (G45) was a Q-class destroyer launched in 1942. She struck a mine on 15 November 1943 and sank while under tow on 18 June 1944.
