= HMS Procris =

Three ships of the Royal Navy bore the name Procris:

- HMS Procris (1806), a Cruizer-class brig-sloop launched in 1806. She served at the second battle of Copenhagen. She then went out to the East Indies where she spent the rest of her active service, including participating in the 1811 invasion of Java. She returned to Britain in 1814 and was sold the next year. She then became a merchantman, while retaining her name. She traded primarily with North America but on a voyage in the Mediterranean an armed Greek brig captured her. However, her master was able to regain control. She was wrecked on 25 August 1839. She was wrecked on 25 August 1839.
- HMS Procris (1821), a Cherokee-class brig-sloop sold in 1837.
- HMS Procris (1856), a gunboat.
