= HMS Pouncer =

British merchant vessel (1785–1797) and naval gun-vessel (1797–1802)

History

Great Britain
- Name: David
- Launched: 1785, Leith
- Fate: Sold 1797

Great Britain
- Name: GB No.38
- Acquired: 1797 by purchase
- Renamed: HMS Pouncer
- Fate: Sold 1802

United Kingdom
- Name: David
- Acquired: 1802

General characteristics
- Tons burthen: 162, or 165, or 174, or 180 (bm)
- Length: Overall: 76 ft 10 in (23.4 m); Keel: 63 ft 8 in (19.4 m)
- Beam: 22 ft 1 3/4 in (6.8 m)
- Depth of hold: 8 ft 9 1/2 in (2.7 m)
- Complement: 50
- Armament: Pouncer: 2 × 18-pounder guns + 10 × 18-pounder carronades; David (1809): 8 × 6-pounder + 2 × 9-pounder guns; David (1813): 8 × 9-pounder + 2 × 12-pounder guns

HMS Pouncer was the mercantile David, launched in 1785 at Leith, that the Admiralty purchased and armed in 1797 as GB No.38. David originally sailed to the Baltic and then to the Mediterranean. From 1793 or so till her sale to the Admiralty she sailed as a transport under contract to the Transport Board. The Navy renamed GB No.38 HMS Pouncer, and she was the only naval vessel ever to bear that name. The Navy sold Pouncer in 1802 following the Peace of Amiens. She then returned to mercantile service as the West Indiaman David. Under several masters and owners she traded more widely. In 1816 she sank, but was recovered.

== David ==
David first appeared in Lloyd's Register (LR) in 1786, the volume for 1785 not being available online.

Year	Master	Owner	Trade	Source
1786	J.Bridges	J.Scougal	Petersburg–Leith	LR
1787	J.Bridges	J.Scougal	Leghorn–Leith	LR
1790	J.Briggs; J.Wilson	J.Scougal	Leghorn–Leith	LR
1791	J.Wilson	J.Scougal	Leghorn–Leith	LR
1797	J.Wilson	J.Scougal	Leith transport	LR

Her owners sold David to the Admiralty in March 1797 at Leith.

== HMS Pouncer ==
The Navy took David in as GB No.38 and she underwent fitting at Leith between March and 20 August 1797.

Lieutenant George B. Smith commissioned GB No.38 in May 1797, for the North Sea. She became Pouncer on 7 August 1797.

On 9 December 1800, the French privateer Victoire, of 14 guns and 60 men, sailing out of Dunkirk, captured the sloop Lamb, of Boston in Lancashire, off Flamborough Head. Pouncer recaptured Lamb the same day and sent her into Leith. The privateer had also captured two light colliers.

In May 1801 Lieutenant John Clements replaced Smith in Yarmouth roads. Smith returned to command of Pouncer in December 1801.

Disposal: The "Principal Officers and Commissioners of His Majesty's Navy" offered the "Pouncer Gun-Vessel, 165 tons,...lying at Sheerness", for sale on 9 September 1802.

== David ==
David, of 170 tons (bm), built in Leith in 1785, reappeared in the Register of Shipping (RS), in 1805. She was sailing as a West Indiaman, after having been raised and having received a new deck in 1803. Her master was R. Graves, and her owner was Robertson.

Year	Master	Owner	Trade	Source & notes
1806	R.Graves; H.M'Askell	Robertson	London–Trinidad; London–Demerara	RS; raised and new deck 1803
1809	Lambert	Robertson	London–Demerara	RS; raised and new deck 1803
1810	Thorp	Oxnam	Falmouth–West Indies /London–Grenada	RS; good repair 1809
1811	Thorp; J.Taylor	Oxnam	London–Grenada; London–Rio de Janeiro	RS; good repair 1809

On 4 May 1812, David, Taylor, master, put into Grenada leaky. She had been on her way from Berbice to London. Part of her cargo had been unloaded, which enabled the leak to be stopped. It was expected that she would sail in a few days. She arrived at Gravesend, Kent on 10 August.

Year	Master	Owner	Trade	Source & notes
1813	J.Taylor; Quariton	Oxnam; J.Spence	London–Rio de Janeiro; London–Africa	RS; good repair 1809
1814	Quariton; H.Colborn	J.Spence	London–Africa; London–Hamburg	RS; good repair 1809

In November 1816, Lloyd's List reported that as David, Colburn, master, was coming into Calais while on a voyage from Memel, Prussia to Cowes, she struck on the bar. She unshipped her rudder, and having received considerable damage, sank. David was recovered and repaired.

Year	Master	Owner	Trade	Source & notes
1819	H.Colburn	Clapp & Co.	Teignmouth–Liverpool	LR; raised 1802, & some repairs 1818
