= HMS Banterer =

Six ships of the Royal Navy have borne the name HMS Banterer:

- HMS Banterer (1807) was a 22-gun sixth rate launched in 1807 and wrecked in 1808.
- HMS Banterer (1810) was a 14-gun Crocus-class brig-sloop launched in 1810 and sold in 1817 for breaking up. Mercantile interests purchased her and named her Anna.
- HMS Banterer (1824) was a 16-gun sloop launched in 1824
- HMS Banterer (1855) was an Albacore-class wooden screw gunboat launched in 1855 and sold in 1872.
- HMS Banterer (1880) was a Banterer-class composite screw gunboat launched in 1880 and sold in 1907.
- HMS Banterer was an iron twin-screw coastal gunboat launched in 1870 as HMS Plucky. She was renamed HMS Banterer in 1915 and was sold in 1928.
