= HMS Phosphorus =

Two vessels of the Royal Navy have been named HMS Phosphorus for phosphorus:

- HMS Phosphorus (1804) was the Dutch naval vessel Haasje that the Royal Navy captured in 1803 and took into service in 1804 as a fireship. She took part in a notable single-ship action in 1806. The Navy sold her in 1810. She then became a merchantman trading with the Mediterranean until she was lost c.1813.
- HMS Phosphorus was an Admiralty drifter built by A.Hall & Co. in 1918. The Admiralty sold her in 1919. She was renamed Ocean Sprite and under that named served during World War II.
