= HMS Postillion =

Four ships of the Royal Navy have borne the name HMS Postillion, after the Postilion, the driver of a horse-drawn coach or post chaise, mounted on one of the drawing horses:

- HMS Postillion (1702) was a 10-gun sixth rate, previously the French Postillion. She was captured in 1702 by HMS Worcester (1698) and was wrecked in 1709.
- HMS Postillion (1757) was an 18-gun sloop, previously the French privateer Duc D'Aiguillon. She was captured in 1757 and was sold in 1763.
- HMS Postillion (1776) was a 10-gun schooner purchased in 1776 and sold in 1779.
- HMS Postillion (J296) was an Algerine-class minesweeper launched in 1943 and transferred to the navy under lend-lease. She was returned to the United States Navy in 1946, and sold to the Greek Navy in 1947 and renamed Machitis. She was sunk as a target in 1984.
