= HMS Porpoise =

Eleven ships of the Royal Navy have borne the name HMS Porpoise, after the marine mammal, the porpoise:

- HMS Porpoise (1777) was a 16-gun sloop, formerly Annapolis, purchased in 1777. She was renamed HMS Firebrand in 1778 and was burnt off Falmouth in 1781.
- HMS Porpoise (1780) was a 14-gun storeship purchased in 1780 and sold in 1783.
- HMS Porpoise (1798) was also a storeship, launched in 1798, renamed HMS Diligent in 1801 and sold in 1802.
- HMS Porpoise (1799) was a 10-gun storeship, formerly the Spanish sloop Infanta Amelia. HMS Argo captured her in 1799 off Portugal; Porpoise was wrecked in 1803 off New South Wales.
- HMS Porpoise (1804) was a 10-gun storeship, formerly Lord Melville, launched in 1804. The Admiralty purchased her that same year and sold her in 1816. As the mercantile Lord Melville she made two voyages to Australia transporting convicts; he was last listed in 1820.
- HMS Porpoise (1855) was a mortar vessel launched in 1855. She was renamed MV 8 later that year and hulked in 1866, before being sold in 1885.
- HMS Porpoise (1856) was a wood screw Albacore-class gunboat, launched in 1856 and broken up in 1864.
- HMS Porpoise (1886) was an Archer-class torpedo cruiser launched in 1886 and sold in 1905.
- HMS Porpoise (1913) was an Acasta-class destroyer launched in 1913 and sold to the Brazilian Navy in 1920, who renamed her Maranhão.
- HMS Porpoise (N14) was a Grampus-class submarine launched in 1932. She served in the Second World War and was sunk in 1945.
- HMS Porpoise (S01) was a Porpoise-class diesel patrol submarine launched in 1956 and sunk as a target in 1985.
