= HMS Orford =

Five ships of the Royal Navy have borne the name HMS Orford, named initially after the Suffolk town of Orford, but from 1697 after Admiral Edward Russell, who was created Earl of Orford in 1697:

- HMS Orford (1695) was a 24-gun sixth rate launched in 1695. She was renamed HMS Newport in 1698 and was sold in 1718.
- HMS Orford (1698) was a 70-gun third rate launched in 1698. She was rebuilt in 1713 and wrecked in 1745.
- HMS Orford (1749) was a 70-gun third rate launched in 1749. She was on harbour service from 1777 and was sunk as a breakwater in 1783.
- HMS Orford was to have been a 74-gun third rate. She was cancelled in 1809.
- HMS Orford (1916) was an Admiralty M-class destroyer launched in 1916 and sold in 1921.

== See also ==
- HMS Orford Prize
- HMS Orford Ness
