= HMS Obdurate =

Two ships of the Royal Navy have been named HMS Obdurate:

- HMS Obdurate (1916), an Admiralty M-class destroyer launched in 1916 and sold in 1921.
- HMS Obdurate (G39), an O-class destroyer launched in 1942 and scrapped in 1964.
