= HMS Phaeton =

Several ships of the Royal Navy have been named HMS Phaeton or Phaëton after Phaëton, the son of Helios in Greek mythology:

- HMS Phaeton (1691), a purpose-built fireship launched in 1691, was expended against the French Navy at La Hogue in 1692.
- HMS Phaeton (1739), also a fireship, formerly a merchantman purchased in 1739, served as an escort during the War of Austrian Succession.
- HMS Phaeton (1782), a frigate launched in 1782 which served during the Napoleonic Wars, created an incident in Nagasaki harbour, Japan, in 1808.
- HMS Phaeton (1848), a 32-pounder armed sailing frigate launched in 1848, was converted in 1859 to screw propulsion.
- HMS Phaeton (1883), launched 1883, was a Leander-class protected cruiser.
- HMS Phaeton (1914), launched 1914, was an Arethusa-class light cruiser. She served in World War I.
- HMS Phaeton, launched 1934, was a Leander-class light cruiser transferred to the Royal Australian Navy and renamed HMAS Sydney. She was sunk by the German auxiliary cruiser Kormoran in World War II.
