= HMS Pursuer =

Several ships of the Royal Navy have been named HMS Pursuer.

- HMS Pursuer (D73) – an escort carrier of the Second World War, built in 1942 as SS Mormacland transferred to the Royal Navy under Lend-Lease, returned to the US Navy in 1946 to be scrapped.
- HMS Pursuer (1947) – a tank landing ship, originally launched as LST 3504 in 1944, and renamed in 1947. Transferred to the Ministry of Transport in 1956 and renamed Empire Tern. She was broken up in 1969.
- HMS Pursuer (P273) – an Archer-class fast patrol boat, launched in 1986 and completed in 1988.

== Battle honours ==
- Atlantic 1943–45
- Norway 1944
- Normandy 1944
- South France 1944
- Aegean 1944
