= HMS Pigeon (1805) =

History

United Kingdom
- Name: HMS Pigeon
- Ordered: 11 December 1805
- Launched: 1801
- Acquired: ex-mercantile Fanny purchased 28 May 1805
- Commissioned: May 1805
- Fate: Wrecked 30 November 1805

General characteristics
- Class & type: Despatch cutter
- Type: Schooner
- Tons burthen: 75 bm
- Length: 57 ft 7 in (17.55 m)
- Beam: 17 ft 6 in (5.33 m)
- Propulsion: Sails
- Complement: 17
- Armament: 4 × 12-pounder carronades

HMS Pigeon was the mercantile Fanny which the Admiralty purchased on 28 May 1805 for use as a despatch cutter. She was wrecked, though without loss of life, in November.

== Service ==
After her purchase, Pigeon was fitted for foreign service at Deptford between 25 May and 10 August. She was commissioned in May under Lieutenant John Luckraft. One of his first tasks was to pick up Dudley Ryder, 1st Earl of Harrowby, from Tribune and to convey him up the Elbe River to Hamburg on a diplomatic mission.

== Fate ==
Pigeon was wrecked off the Texel on 30 November while carrying despatches for Lieutenant General George Don at Bremerlehe. (Note: Gosset has the wreck occurring on a sandbank three quarters of a mile from the town of Rysum in East Frisia. However, this is less consistent with accounts that put the wreck off the Texel and that she was carrying despatches to Bremerlehe and that the crew became prisoners of the Dutch.) Her crew was saved, but became prisoners of the Dutch. Luckraft was freed the next year.

The court martial on 20 February 1806 found that it was pilot Robert Barron's inexperience that caused the wreck; he was severely reprimanded and lost all pay. However, the court saved its greatest criticism for Luckraft. It deemed his actions before and after the wreck to be so incompetent that it constituted criminal negligence. He was so drunk at the time of the wreck that his orders were incoherent. The court ordered him dismissed the service and to be imprisoned in the Marshalsea or two months.
