= HMS Patriot =

Two ships of the Royal Navy have borne the name HMS Patriot:

- HMS Patriot (1808) was a 10-gun gun vessel captured from the Dutch in 1808 and sold in 1815.
- HMS Patriot (1916) was an Thornycroft M-class destroyer launched in 1916. She was transferred to the Royal Canadian Navy in 1920 as HMCS Patriot, and was sold in 1929.
