= HMS Obedient =

Two destroyers of the British Royal Navy have been named HMS Obedient:

- The first, HMS Obedient (1916), launched in 1916, was an Admiralty M-class destroyer that served in World War I, and was sold in 1921.
- The second, HMS Obedient (G48), launched in 1942, was an O-class destroyer that served in World War II, engaging the German heavy cruiser Admiral Hipper on 31 December 1942 (Battle of the Barents Sea). She was broken up in 1962.
