= HMS Portia =

Two ships of the Royal Navy have borne the name HMS Portia. Another was renamed before being launched, while yet another was never completed:

- HMS Portia (1810) was a 14-gun brig-sloop launched in 1810 and sold in 1817.
- HMS Portia was to have been a Philomel-class gunvessel. She was laid down in 1861, but cancelled in 1863.
- HMS Portia (1906) was a fleet messenger sunk in 1915 by SM U-28
- HMS Portia was to have been a Laforey-class destroyer. She was renamed HMS Lennox (1914) in 1913, and launched in 1914.
- HMS Portia (1916) was an Admiralty M-class destroyer launched in 1916. She was sold in 1921 and scrapped in 1922.
