= HMS P33 =

Two ships of the Royal Navy have been named HMS P33.

- HMS P33 (1916), a P-class patrol boat launched in 1916 and sold in 1921.
- HMS P33 (1941), a U-class submarine launched in January 1941 and sunk in August 1941.
