= USS Portsmouth =

USS Portsmouth may refer to the following ships of the United States Navy:

- USS Portsmouth (1798), was a 24-gun ship in service from 1798 to 1801
- USS Portsmouth (1843), was a sloop-of-war commissioned in 1844, active in the Mexican–American War 1846–1848, decommissioned in 1878 but continuing as a training ship until 1915
- USS Portsmouth (CL-102), was a Cleveland-class light cruiser in service from 1945 to 1949
- USS Portsmouth (SSN-707), a Los Angeles-class nuclear attack submarine commissioned in 1983 and decommissioned in 2004

== See also ==
- USNS Portsmouth, an upcoming Bethesda-class expeditionary medical ship.
