= HMS Opportune =

Three ships of the Royal Navy have carried the name HMS Opportune:

- HMS Opportune (1915) was an Admiralty M-class destroyer. She was launched on 20 November 1915 and scrapped in December 1923.
- HMS Opportune (G80) was an O-class destroyer. She was launched on 21 February 1942 and scrapped in November 1955.
- HMS Opportune (S20) was an Oberon-class submarine. She was launched on 14 February 1964 and sold in 1992.
