= HMS Port Mahon =

HMS Port Mahon has been the name of several ships of the British Royal Navy, and may refer to:

- HMS Port Mahon (1711), a 20-gun sixth rate launched in 1711 and scrapped in 1740
- HMS Port Mahon (1740), a 24-gun sixth rate launched in 1740 and sold in 1763
- HMS Port Mahon (1798), an 18-gun brig-sloop captured on the stocks in 1798, launched in 1798, hulked in 1817, and sold in 1837.
