= HMS Pellew =

Three ships of the Royal Navy have borne the name HMS Pellew, after Admiral Sir Edward Pellew, 1st Viscount Exmouth, or his brother, Admiral Sir Israel Pellew. A fourth was planned but renamed before being launched:

- HMS Pellew (1916) was an Admiralty M-class destroyer launched in 1916. She was sold in 1921 and broken up in 1923.
- HMS Pellew was to have been a destroyer, ordered in 1942. The order was cancelled and transferred to another shipyard, and she was launched in 1944 as the C-class destroyer HMS Carysfort (R25).
- HMS Pellew (F62) was a Blackwood-class frigate launched in 1954 and sold in 1971.
- HMS Pellew (1982) was a stone frigate of the Royal Naval Reserve in Exeter. She was decommissioned in 1994.

== See also ==
- HMS Exmouth
