= HMS Penelope =

Nine ships of the British Royal Navy have been named HMS Penelope, after the faithful wife Penelope of Greek mythology.

- The first HMS Penelope (1778) was a 24-gun sixth rate launched in 1778 and captured by her Spanish prisoners in 1780.
- The second HMS Penelope (1783) was a 32-gun fifth rate launched in 1783 and broken up 1797.
- The third HMS Penelope (1798) was a 36-gun fifth rate launched in 1798 and wrecked in 1815.
- The fourth HMS Penelope (1829) was a 46-gun fifth rate launched in 1829 but completed in 1843 as a paddle frigate, and sold for breakup in 1864.
- The fifth HMS Penelope (1867) was an armoured corvette launched in 1867 that became a prison hulk in 1897 and was sold in 1912.
- The sixth HMS Penelope (1914) was an Arethusa-class light cruiser launched in 1914 and sold in 1924.
- The seventh HMS Penelope (1918) was a tender purchased in 1918 and sold in 1922.
- The eighth HMS Penelope (97) was an Arethusa-class light cruiser launched in 1935 and sunk off Naples in 1944.
- The ninth HMS Penelope (F127) was a Leander-class frigate launched in 1962 and sold to Ecuador in 1991, which operated her as Presidente Eloy Alfaro.

In addition, the hired armed cutter Penelope served in the Royal Navy from 1794 until her capture in 1799.

== Battle honours ==
Ships named Penelope have earned the following battle honours:

- Guillaume Tell, 1800
- Egypt, 1801
- Martinique, 1809
- Baltic, 1854
- Alexandria, 1882
- Norway, 1940
- Mediterranean, 1941−43
- Malta Convoys, 1941−42
- Sirte, 1942
- Sicily, 1943
- Salerno, 1943
- Aegean, 1943
- Anzio, 1944
- Falkland Islands, 1982

== See also ==
- Hired armed cutter Penelope
