= HMS Pelican Prize =

Two ships of the British Royal Navy have been named HMS Pelican Prize.

- Pelican Prize was a 34-gun ship captured in 1653 and sold in 1655.
- Pelican Prize was an 8-gun fireship captured from France on 7 July 1690 off Dublin and scuttled on 26 August 1692 to form part of the foundations at Sheerness Dockyard.

== See also ==
- HMS Pelican
