= HMS Prince Charles =

HMS Prince Charles was the name of two ships in the Royal Navy:

- HMS Prince Charles was a Q ship in World War I, the first to successfully sink a submarine.
- HMS Prince Charles (1941) was a ferry taken into military service as a Landing Ship, Infantry during the Second World War.
