= HMS Pakenham =

Three ships of the Royal Navy have been named HMS Pakenham, after Admiral Sir Thomas Pakenham:

- The first HMS Pakenham (1797) was a 1-gun gunvessel purchased in 1797. She was in service in 1800 and may have been sold in 1802.
- The second HMS Pakenham was an O-class destroyer. She was renamed HMS Onslow (G17) shortly after being launched in 1941.
- The third HMS Pakenham (G06) was a P-class destroyer built as HMS Onslow but renamed shortly after being launched in 1941. She was sunk in 1943
