= HMS Oryx =

Two ships of the British Royal Navy have been named HMS Oryx:

- The intended name for an Admiralty M-class destroyer, subsequently built as HMS Octavia (1916).
- HMS Oryx (1927), an auxiliary minesweeper, formerly the Norwegian whaler Hval I, hired from 1940 and renamed in 1941; she became HMS Gemsbuck in 1944 and was returned to Norway the following year.
