= HMS Papillon =

Two vessels of the Royal Navy have been named HMS Papillon for the French word for butterfly.

- HMS Papillon (1803) was the French Navy's 12-gun brig Papillon, which the British captured in September 1803. She foundered in September 1805 with the loss of all her crew.
- HMS Papillon (1809) was the French Navy's 18-gun brig Papillon, which HMS Rosamond captured off Guadeloupe in 1809. The Navy sold her in 1815.
