= French frigate Oiseau =

At least two ships of the French Navy have been named Oiseau:

- French frigate Oiseau (1757) a 30-gun frigate launched in 1757 and captured by the Royal Navy in 1762
- French frigate Oiseau (1769) a 26-gun frigate launched in 1769 and captured by the Royal Navy in 1779
