= HMS P48 =

Two ships of the Royal Navy have been named HMS P48.

- HMS P48 (1917), a P-class patrol boat launched in 1917 and sold in 1923.
- HMS P48 (1942), a U-class submarine launched in June 1942 and sunk by Italian torpedo boats on Christmas Day 1942.
