= HMS Orlando =

HMS Orlando has been the name of four ships of the Royal Navy.

- HMS Orlando (1811) was a 36-gun fifth rate launched in 1811, used for harbour service or as a hospital from 1819 and sold in 1824.
- HMS Orlando (1858) was a wood screw frigate launched in 1858 and sold in 1871.
- HMS Orlando (1886) was an Orlando-class armoured cruiser launched in 1886 and scrapped in 1905.
- HMS Orlando was to have been a Laforey-class destroyer, but was renamed HMS Loyal prior to being launched in 1913.
- HMS Orlando (Greenock) was a World War II shore establishment and gunnery school at Navy house, Greenock, Scotland.
