= HMS Pytchley =

Two ships of the Royal Navy have borne the name HMS Pytchley.

- HMS Pytchley (1917) was a Hunt-class minesweeper launched in 1917 and sold in 1922.
- HMS Pytchley (L92) was a Hunt-class destroyer launched in 1940 and scrapped in 1956.
