= HMS Observer =

Three ships of the British Royal Navy have been named HMS Observer:

- HMS Observer (1781), a sloop of 10 guns, was the Massachusetts privateer Amsterdam, which HMS Amphitrite captured on 19 October 1781. Observer was sold on 21 October 1784.
- HMS Observer (1916), an Admiralty M-class destroyer launched in 1916 and sold in 1921.
- HMS Observer, an O-class destroyer renamed whilst under construction to HMS Oribi (G66) and launched in 1941. The ship was transferred to Turkey in 1946 and broken up in 1965.

== See also ==
- HMS Observateur, a French brig launched at Le Havre in 1800, captured in 1806 and sold in 1814.
