= Poppy (nickname) =

Poppy is a nickname. It may refer to:

- family nickname of U.S. President George H. W. Bush (1924–2018), popularized by New York Times columnist Maureen Dowd
- early nickname of Lucy, Lady Houston (1857–1936), British philanthropist, political activist, suffragette, and eccentric
- Katharine Poppy Harlow (born 1982), American news anchor and reporter
- Poppy Windham, stage name of British actress, interior decorator and pioneering aviator Elsie Mackay (c. 1893–1928)
- Frances Northcutt (born 1943), American attorney and first female engineer to work in NASA's Mission Control
- Moriah Rose Pereira (born 1995), American singer, songwriter, and YouTube personality known as Poppy
- Paul Puopolo (born 1987), Australian rules footballer
- Sadika Parvin Popy, Bangladeshi actress
- Dorothy "Poppy" Walker, the titular character of the webcomic Poppy: the Girl Who Slept-in 100 Years
