= HMS Pansy =

Two ships of the Royal Navy have been named HMS Pansy :

- HMS Pansy (1916) an Arabis-class sloop launched in 1916 and sold in 1920
- HMS Pansy (K15), a Flower-class corvette renamed Heartsease before completion. Transferred in 1942 to USN as USS Courage. Returned to RN in 1945 and sold in 1946. Lost in 1958.
