= HMS Phoebe =

HMS Phoebe may refer to:

- HMS Phoebe (1795), 36, a fifth-rate frigate launched in 1795.
- HMS Phoebe (1854), 51, a fourth-rate frigate launched in 1854.
- HMS Phoebe (1890), a Pearl-class second class cruiser launched in 1890.
- HMS Phoebe (1916), an Admiralty M-class destroyer launched in 1916.
- HMS Phoebe (43), a Dido-class light cruiser launched in 1939.
- HMS Phoebe (F42), a Leander-class frigate launched in 1964. The ship played the fictional HMS Hero (F42) in the 1970s Warship BBC television drama series.
