= HMS Pomone =

Four Royal Navy ships have borne the name HMS Pomone, with another cancelled before launch:

- HMS Pomone (1794), a 44-gun French frigate captured on 23 April 1794 and broken up in 1802.
- HMS Pomone (1805), a 38-gun frigate built in 1805 and wrecked in 1811.
- HMS Pomone, 38-gun French frigate Astrée captured on 6 December 1810; renamed Pomone in 1811 and paid off in 1815.
- HMS Pomone, a 51-gun Bristol-class screw frigate, ordered in 1860 but cancelled in 1863 before being launched.
- HMS Pomone (1897), a Pelorus-class cruiser built in 1897 and scrapped in 1922.

== See also ==
- HMS Pomona
- French ship Pomone
