= HMS Pike =

Five ships of the Royal Navy have borne the name HMS Pike, after the Northern pike, a species of fish:

- HMS Pike (1804) was a 4-gun Ballahoo-class schooner launched in 1804 and captured by a French privateer in 1807. Moselle recaptured her in 1808, and she reentered naval service; her ultimate fate is currently not clear.
- HMS Fleur de la Mer was the French privateer schooner Gipsey, captured in 1806, and was renamed Pike in 1808 but reverted to her previous name after the recapture of Pike. She foundered in 1810.
- HMS Pike (1813) was a 14-gun schooner, previously the American Dart. She was captured in 1813 and was wrecked in 1836.
- HMS Pike (1837) was a wooden paddle packet launched in 1824 as the General Post Office's Spitfire. She was transferred to the Royal Navy in 1837 and was broken up in 1868.
- HMS Pike (1856) was an Ant-class iron screw gunboat launched in 1872. She became a boom defence vessel in 1908 and was sold in 1920.
