= HMS Pomona =

Two Royal Navy ships have borne the name HMS Pomona:

- HMS Pomona (1761), the 18-gun French sloop-of-war Cheveret captured on 30 January 1761 and wrecked in a hurricane in 1776.
- HMS Pomona (1778), a 28-gun Enterprise-class sixth-rate frigate launched in 1778. She was renamed Amphitrite in 1795 and broken up in 1811.

== See also ==
- HMS Pomone
