= HMS Pallas =

Seven ships of the United Kingdom's Royal Navy have been called HMS Pallas. See Pallas (disambiguation) for various figures called "Pallas" in Greek mythology.

- The first HMS Pallas (1757) was a 36-gun fifth rate launched at Deptford in 1757 and run aground in 1783.
- The second HMS Pallas (1793) was a 32-gun fifth rate launched at Woolwich Dockyard in 1793 and wrecked in 1798 on Mount Batten Point, near Plymouth.
- The third Pallas was a 38-gun fifth rate launched at Woolwich Dockyard in 1780 as HMS Minerva but renamed HMS Pallas when she was converted to a troopship in 1798. She was broken up in 1803.
- A Pallas was ordered but before construction started her name was changed and she was launched in 1803 as HMS Shannon.
- The fourth HMS Pallas was another 32-gun fifth rate launched at Plymouth in 1804 and wrecked in 1810 at the Firth of Forth.
- The fifth HMS Pallas (1816) was a 36-gun fifth rate launched at Portsmouth in 1816, and converted to a coal hulk in 1836. She was sold in 1862.
- The sixth HMS Pallas (1865) was an armoured corvette launched at Woolwich Dockyard in 1865, and sold in 1886.
- The seventh HMS Pallas (1890) was a Pearl-class second class cruiser launched at Portsmouth in 1890, and sold in 1906.
