= HMS Pitt =

Six vessels of the Royal Navy have borne the name HMS Pitt:

- HMS Pitt (1763) was an 8-gun cutter purchased in 1763 that foundered in the Atlantic in 1766, "coming from Africa".
- HMS Pitt (1805) was a 12-gun schooner purchased in 1805, renamed Sandwich in 1807, and broken up in 1809.
- HMS Salsette was a 36-gun Perseverance-class fifth rate frigate launched as HMS Pitt in 1805, but was renamed Salsette in 1807, and was broken up in 1874.
- HMS Doris was named Salsette before her acquisition by the Royal Navy, renamed Pitt, and then Doris in 1807, and sold at Valparaiso in 1829.
- HMS Pitt (1816) was a 74-gun third rate launched in 1816, became a coal hulk in 1853, and was broken up in 1877.
- HMS Pitt was a screw 91-gun second rate ordered in 1860 but cancelled in 1863.
- HMS Trafalgar was a 106-gun first rate launched in 1820, renamed Camperdown in 1825, on harbour service in 1854, coal hulk in 1857, renamed Pitt in 1882, and sold 1906.

== See also ==
- HM hired armed brig Pitt, which served between c.1808 and 1812.
