= HMS Placentia =

Three, and possibly four, vessels of the Royal Navy have borne the name HMS Placentia, after locations in Newfoundland, including Placentia Bay and the town of Placentia:

- HMS Placentia (1775) was a 6-gun schooner purchased in 1775 and wrecked, with the loss of two lives, on 14 September 1775.
- A cutter HMS Placentia apparently served between 1777 and 1779.
- HMS Placentia (1779) was a 14-gun sloop, purchased in 1780 and wrecked on 10 September 1782 on Newfoundland with no survivors. Earlier that year Lieutenant Charles Anderson had captured two American schooners, Lord Sterling and Penguin, each of eight guns.
- HMS Placentia (1789) was a minimally armed sloop launched in 1789, name vessel of her two-vessel class, that her crew abandoned in a sinking state on 8 May 1794 off Marticot Island, Newfoundland.
