= HMS Ormonde =

Four ships of the Royal Navy have borne the name HMS Ormonde:

- HMS Ormonde (1711) was a 54-gun fourth rate launched in 1711. She was renamed HMS Dragon in 1715 and was broken up in 1733.
- HMS Ormonde (1906) was a MS Trawler-class minesweeper built in 1906 by Cochrane & Sons Shipbuilders in Selby and sunk by German aircraft on 16 February 1941, off the east coast of Scotland.
- HMS Ormonde (1918) was a 24-class minesweeping sloop launched in 1918. She became a survey ship in 1924 and was sold in 1937.
- HMS Ormonde (F172) was a Landing Ship, Infantry built as Cape Girardeau but renamed Empire Spearhead before being launched in 1943. She was renamed HMS Ormonde in 1945, the name reverting to Empire Spearhead in 1945, before she was returned to the United States Maritime Commission in 1947.
