= HMS Odin =

Five ships of the Royal Navy have been named HMS Odin after the god Odin in Norse mythology. A sixth was ordered, but later cancelled:

- HMS Odin (1807) was a 74-gun third rate captured from the Danish at the Battle of Copenhagen in 1807. She was used for harbour service from 1811 and was sold in 1825.
- HMS Odin (1846) was a paddle steam frigate launched in 1846 sold in 1865.
- HMS Odin (1901) was a sloop launched in 1901 and sold in 1920. Took part in the Fao Landing in 1914. Delivered the Somali Sultan Mohamoud Ali Shire to the Seychelles in 1920, where he was sentenced to exile.
- HMS Odin (N84) was an Odin-class submarine launched in 1928. She was sunk by Italian ships in 1940.
- HMS Odin was to have been an Algerine-class minesweeper but she was cancelled in 1944.
- HMS Odin (S10) was an Oberon-class submarine launched in 1960 and scrapped in 1991.
