= HMS Poole =

Three vessels of the Royal Navy have been named HMS Poole after Poole:

- HMS Poole (1696) was a 32-gun Lyme group frigate launched in 1696, converted into a fireship in 1719 and sunk as a foundation at Harwich in 1737.
- HMS Poole (1745) was a 44-gun 1741 Establishment frigate launched in 1745 and broken up in 1765.
- HMS Poole (J147) was a Bangor-class minesweeper launched in 1941 and sold for breaking up in 1948.
