= HMS Onyx =

Seven ships of the Royal Navy have borne the name HMS Onyx, after the mineral Onyx. Another was renamed before being launched:

- HMS Onyx (1808) was a 10-gun Cherokee-class brig-sloop launched in 1808 and sold in 1819.
- HMS Onyx (1822) was a 10-gun Cherokee-class brig-sloop launched in 1822 and sold in 1837. Between 1748 and 1852, Onyx carried emigrants from Guernsey to Adelaide.
- HMS Onyx (1845) was an iron paddle packet launched in 1845 and sold in 1854.
- HMS Onyx (1856) was a Cheerful-class wooden screw gunboat launched in 1856. She became a dockyard craft in 1869 and was broken up in 1873.
- HMS Onyx (1892) was an Alarm-class torpedo gunboat launched in 1892. She became a depot ship in 1907 and was renamed HMS Vulcan II in 1919. She was sold in 1924.
- HMS Onyx (J221) was an Algerine-class minesweeper launched in 1942 and scrapped in 1967.
- HMS Onyx was to have been an Oberon-class submarine. She was transferred to the Royal Canadian Navy and renamed HMCS Ojibwa before her launch in 1964.
- HMS Onyx (S21) was an Oberon-class submarine launched in 1967. She was decommissioned in 1990 and handed over to the Warship Preservation Trust in 1991.
