= HMS Persian =

Three ships of the Royal Navy have borne the name HMS Persian:

- HMS Persian (1809) was a Cruizer-class brig-sloop launched in 1809 and wrecked in 1813.
- HMS Persian (1839) was an Acorn-class brig-sloop launched in 1839 and broken up in 1866.
- HMS Persian (1890) was a Pearl-class cruiser launched in 1890 and shortly afterwards before completion renamed HMS Wallaroo. In 1919 she was further renamed HMS Wallington and sold for scrap in 1920.
