= HMS Poictiers =

Two ships of the British Royal Navy have been named HMS Poictiers. Poictiers is an alternative spelling for Poitiers, and in this instance commemorates the English victory there.

- The first HMS Poictiers (1809) was a 74-gun third rate launched in 1809. She participated in an action where she rescued HMS Frolic by capturing USS Wasp in 1812. Poictiers was broken up in 1857.
- The second Poictiers was a 2,380-ton Battle-class destroyer launched in April 1946, but broken up soon after.
