= HMS Orange Tree =

Three ships of the Royal Navy have been named HMS Orange Tree

- HMS Orange Tree (1652) was a hoy captured in 1652 and sold in 1655.
- HMS Orange Tree (1672) was a 6-gun fireship bought in 1672 and destroyed in an accidental fire in 1673.
- HMS Orange Tree (1677) was a 30-gun fifth rate captured from Algerian forces in 1677. She was sold in 1687.

== See also ==
- HMS Orange
- HMS Orangeville
