= HMS Pactolus =

Two Royal Navy ships have carried the name HMS Pactolus, after the river in which, according to legend, King Midas washed his hands to divest himself of the golden touch.

- The first HMS Pactolus (1813) was a frigate built in 1813 that was decommissioned in 1817.
- The second HMS Pactolus (1896) was a Pelorus-class cruiser built in 1896 and sold for scrap in 1921.
