= HMS Orange =

Three ships of the Royal Navy have been named HMS Orange, after the House of Orange-Nassau:

- HMS Orange (1665) was a 32-gun fifth rate captured from the Dutch Navy in 1665 and lost in 1671.
- HMS Orange (1672) was a 6-gun fireship captured in 1672 and burnt in an accident in 1673.
- HMS Orange (1809) was a 2-gun gunboat sold in 1811.

== See also ==
- HMS Orange Tree
- HMS Orangeville
