= Otus (education) =

Educational technology company

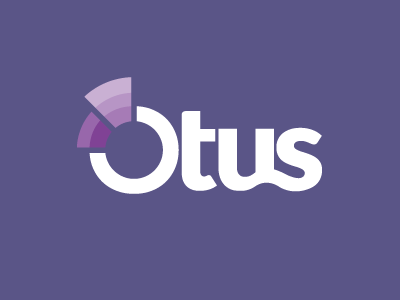
- Company type: Private
- Website type: Education Technology
- Available in: English, Portuguese
- Founded: 2012
- Headquarters: Chicago, IL
- Area served: Worldwide
- Founders: Chris Hull, Pete Helfers, Andy Bluhm
- Industry: Education
- Services: Student Performance Platform, Learning management system, Data warehouse, Classroom management tools
- Website: www.otus.com
- Current status: Active

Otus is a U.S.-based education technology company that provides a K–12 data, assessment, and analytics platform designed to help educators monitor student progress, inform instructional decisions, and improve overall performance. The platform integrates academic, behavioral, attendance, cognitive and other student data into a unified system to support school and district-level decision-making.

== History ==
Otus was founded in 2012 by Chris Hull and Pete Helfers, two former teachers, with the goal of helping teachers and school leaders access and act on student data more effectively. After receiving $2 million in funding from Andy Bluhm, Otus was officially launched in August 2014 and now serves schools and districts across the United States.

In December 2025, Otus acquired MindPrint Learning, a company focused on cognitive assessment and strengths-based interventions. The acquisition expanded Otus’ capabilities to include cognitive data alongside academic and behavioral metrics.

== Platform and Features ==
Otus provides a centralized platform that combines multiple aspects of student data and classroom workflows. Key components of the platform include:

- Data and Analytics: Aggregates student data from multiple sources into dashboards and reports for educators and administrators.
- Assessment Tools: Supports the creation and administration of assessments, including standards-based and rubric-based evaluations.
- Gradebook and Progress Monitoring: Allows educators to track student performance over time and align grading practices with district standards.
- Student Profiles: Provides a comprehensive view of each student, incorporating academic, behavioral, attendance, and cognitive data.
- Portfolio: Enables students and educators to collect and organize artifacts of student work, reflections, and evidence of learning. Portfolios can be used to document progress over time and support competency-based or skills-based evaluation frameworks, such as a district’s portrait of a graduate.

== Artificial Intelligence and Insights ==
Otus incorporates artificial intelligence (AI) features designed to assist educators in analyzing student data. These tools aim to identify trends, highlight areas of need, and support instructional planning by providing recommendations based on available data.

The company emphasizes that AI-driven insights are dependent on the quality and completeness of underlying data, and positions its platform as a system that integrates multiple data sources to improve accuracy and usability.
