= HMS Perseus =

Six ships of the Royal Navy have borne the name HMS Perseus, after the Greek hero Perseus:

- HMS Perseus (1776) was a 20-gun sixth rate launched in 1776; she was the first vessel of the Royal Navy to be sheathed in copper. She was converted to a bomb vessel in 1799 and was broken up in 1805.
- HMS Perseus (1812) was a 22-gun sixth rate launched in 1812. She was used for harbour service from 1818 and was broken up in 1850.
- HMS Perseus (1861) was a Camelion-class wooden screw sloop launched in 1861. She was used for harbour service from 1886, was renamed HMS Defiance II in 1904 and was probably sold in 1912.
- HMS Perseus (1897) was a Pelorus-class protected cruiser launched in 1897 and sold for scrap in 1914.
- HMS Perseus (N36) was a Parthian-class submarine launched in 1929 and sunk in 1941 during the Second World War.
- HMS Perseus (R51) was a Colossus-class aircraft carrier launched in 1944 as HMS Edgar but renamed a few months later. She was scrapped in 1958.
