= HMS Primrose =

Multiple ships of the Royal Navy and its predecessors have been named Primrose including:

- English ship Primrose (1651), a 22-gun fifth rate of the navy of the Commonwealth of England, launched in 1651 and wrecked in 1656
- HMS Primrose (1807) was a Cruizer-class brig-sloop launched in 1807 and wrecked in 1809
- HMS Primrose (1810) was the sole ship of her class; she was broken up in 1832
- HMS Primrose (1915) was an Acacia-class sloop launched in 1915 and sold in 1923
- HMS Primrose (K91) was a Flower-class corvette, launched in 1940 and sold in 1946
