= HMS P38 =

Two ships of the Royal Navy have been named HMS P38.

- HMS P38 (1917), a P-class patrol boat launched in 1917. Renamed HMS Spey on 11 December 1925 and assigned to fishery protection, the vessel was sold in May 1938.
- HMS P38 (1941), a U-class submarine launched in July 1941 and sunk on 23 February 1942 by the Italian torpedo boat Circe north of Tripoli, Libya.
