= HMS Parthian =

Four ships of the Royal Navy have been named HMS Parthian, after the Parthian Empire.

- HMS Parthian (1808) was a ten-gun Cherokee-class brig-sloop launched in 1808 and wrecked on the coast of Egypt on 15 May 1828.
- HMS Parthian (1856) was a wooden gunboat launched in 1856 and broken up in 1864.
- HMS Parthian (1916) was an Admiralty M-class destroyer launched in 1916 and sold for scrapping in 1921.
- HMS Parthian (N75) was a Parthian-class submarine launched in 1929, and sunk in 1943.
