= HMS Opossum =

Six ships of the Royal Navy have borne the name HMS Opossum, after the opossum:

- HMS Opossum (1808) was a Cherokee-class brig-sloop launched in 1808 and sold in 1819.
- HMS Opossum (1821) was a Cherokee-class brig-sloop launched in 1821 and sold in 1841.
- HMS Opossum (1856) was an Albacore-class wooden screw gunboat launched in 1856. She became a hospital hulk in 1876, and a mooring vessel in 1891. She was renamed HMS Siren in 1895 and was sold in 1896.
- HMS Opossum (1895) was a Sunfish-class destroyer launched in 1895 and sold in 1920.
- HMS Opossum (U33) was a Black Swan-class sloop launched in 1944 and broken up in 1960.
- HMS Opossum (S19) was an Oberon-class submarine launched in 1963 and broken up in 1996.
