= HMS Oakley =

Three ships of the British Royal Navy have been named HMS Oakley:

- HMS Oakley (1917), a Hunt-class minesweeper launched in 1917 and sold in 1923.
- HMS Oakley (L72), a Hunt-class destroyer launched in October 1940 and transferred to the Polish Navy in June 1941 where she served as ORP Kujawiak until she sunk whilst under tow in June 1942 near Malta after being crippled by a mine.
- HMS Oakley (L98) was another Hunt II-class destroyer, launched in January 1942 and originally to have been named HMS Tickham, but renamed after the sale to Poland and subsequent loss of the previous ship. She was sold in 1958 to West Germany where she served as Gneisenau and was broken up in 1972.
