= HMS Ostrich =

Two ships of the Royal Navy have been named HMS Ostrich, after the bird:

- HMS Ostrich (1777) was a 14-gun sloop purchased in 1777 and sold in 1782.
- HMS Ostrich (1900) was a Gipsy-class destroyer launched in 1900 and sold in 1920.
