= HMS Poppy =

Two ships of the British Royal Navy have been named HMS Poppy after the flower.

- HMS Poppy (1915) was an Arabis-class sloop launched in 1915 and sold in 1923.
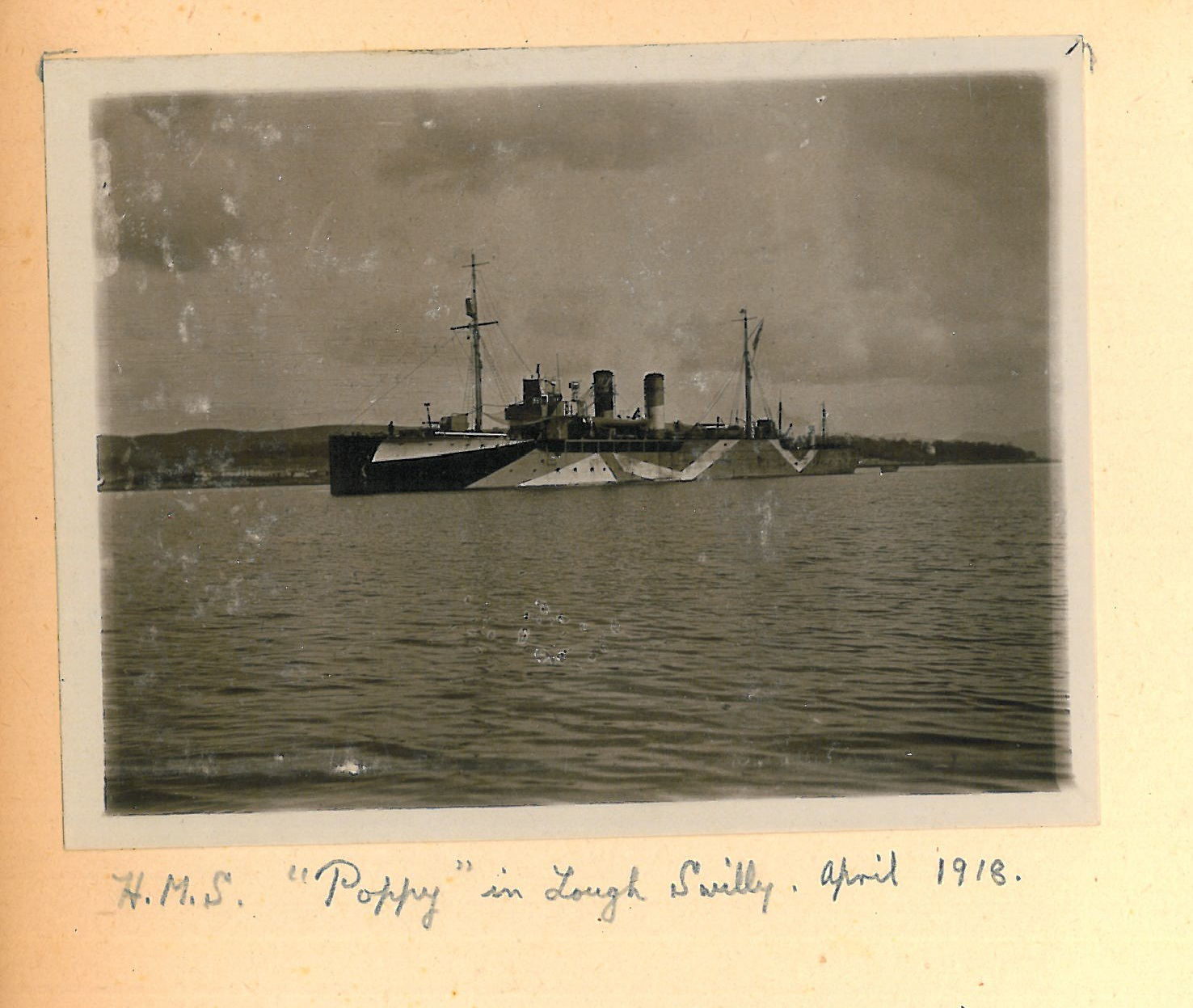
  Picture taken by Eric Murray in 1918
- HMS Poppy (K213) was a Flower-class corvette launched in 1941 and sold in 1946 for mercantile service as Rami.
