= HMS Otus =

Two ships of the Royal Navy have borne the name HMS Otus:

- HMS Otus (N92) was an Odin-class submarine launched in 1928. After service in Hong Kong during the Second World War she was transferred to Durban in 1943 as a training vessel. She was sold in 1946 and her hull was scuttled off Durban that year. The wreck was rediscovered in 2013 roughly 8 km (5.0 mi) from Durban harbour and is a specialist deep wreck dive.
- HMS Otus (S18) was an Oberon-class submarine launched in 1962. She was paid off in 1991, and sold in 1992. She became a museum ship in 2002.
