= HMS Oiseau =

Three ships of the British Royal Navy have been named HMS Oiseau, after the French for bird:

- HMS Oiseau (1762), a 26-gun sixth rate captured from France on 23 October 1762 by HMS Brune in the Mediterranean.
- HMS Oiseau (1779), a 32-gun fifth rate, launched in 1769 as the frigate Oiseau, captured from France on 31 January 1779 by HMS Apollo and sold on 19 June 1783. She then became the Liverpool-based slaver Count du Nord. Last listed in 1789. May have become the Dover, sold to the Imperial East India Company, Ostend (Austrian flag) in 1796.
- HMS Oiseau, a 36-gun fifth rate originally the French frigate Cléopâtre, which HMS Nymphe captured on 18 January 1793. Oiseau was converted to a prison ship in 1806 and sold on 18 September 1816.
