= HMS Orestes (1916) =

British M-Class destroyer

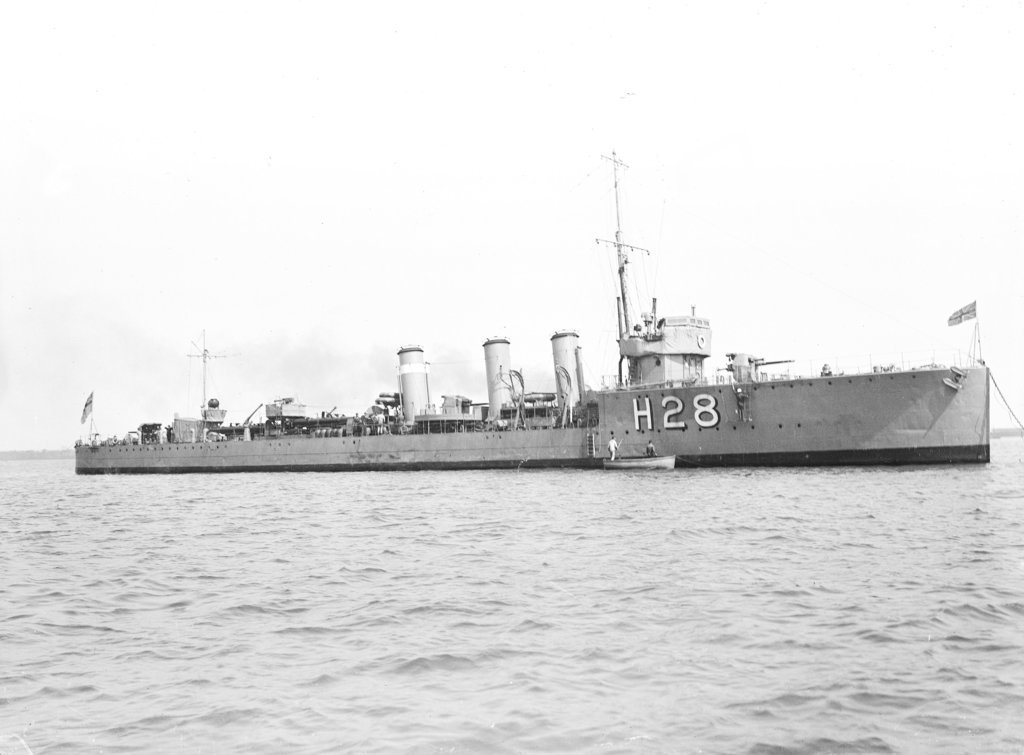
- Sister ship HMS Orpheus in 1918

History

United Kingdom
- Name: HMS Orestes
- Namesake: Orestes
- Ordered: November 1914
- Builder: Doxford, Sunderland
- Laid down: 1 March 1915
- Launched: 21 March 1916
- Completed: October 1916
- Out of service: 30 January 1921
- Fate: Sold to be broken up

General characteristics
- Class & type: Admiralty M-class destroyer
- Displacement: 1,025 long tons (1,041 t) (normal); 1,250 long tons (1,270 t) (deep load)
- Length: 273 ft 4 in (83 m) (o.a.); 265 ft (81 m) (p.p.)
- Beam: 26 ft 9 in (8 m)
- Draught: 8 ft 6 in (3 m)
- Installed power: 3 Yarrow boilers, 25,000 shp (19,000 kW)
- Propulsion: Brown-Curtis steam turbines, 3 shafts
- Speed: 34 knots (63.0 km/h; 39.1 mph)
- Range: 3,450 nmi (6,390 km; 3,970 mi) at 15 kn (28 km/h; 17 mph)
- Complement: 80
- Armament: 3 × single QF 4-inch (102 mm) guns; 1 × single 2 pdr (40 mm (1.6 in)) AA gun; 2 × twin 21 in (533 mm) torpedo tubes

HMS Orestes was a Repeat Admiralty M-class destroyer which served in the Royal Navy during the First World War. The M class were an improvement on the previous L-class destroyer, capable of higher speed. The vessel was launched on 21 March 1916 and joined the Grand Fleet. Orestes was involved in seeking submarines in the North Sea, patrolling both independently and as part of large formations. The destroyer did not report any submarines destroyed, but did rescue the survivors from Q-ship Privet after that vessel had successfully sunk the submarine U-85 in a duel in March 1917. Later in the war, the focus was turned to escorting merchant ships and the destroyer helped secure convoys that crossed the Atlantic Ocean. After the Armistice that marked the end of the First World War, the destroyer was placed into reserve until being, on 30 January 1921, decommissioned and sold to be broken up.

== Design and development ==
Orestes was one of twenty-two Repeat Admiralty M-class destroyer destroyers ordered by the British Admiralty in November 1914 as part of the Third War Construction Programme. The M-class was an improved version of the earlier L-class destroyers, required to reach a higher speed in order to counter rumoured German fast destroyers. The design was to achieve a speed of 36 knots (67 km/h; 41 mph), although the destroyers did not achieve this in service. It transpired that the German ships did not exist but the greater performance was appreciated by the navy. The Repeat M class differed from the prewar vessels in having design improvements based on wartime experience.

The destroyer had a length of 265 feet (81 m) between perpendiculars and 273 feet 4 inches (83 m) overall, with a beam of 26 feet 9 inches (8 m) and a draught of 8 feet 6 inches (3 m) at deep load. Displacement was 1,025 long tons (1,041 t) normal and 1,250 long tons (1,270 t) deep load. Power was provided by three Yarrow boilers feeding Brown-Curtis steam turbines rated at 25,000 shaft horsepower (19,000 kW) and driving three shafts, to give a design speed of 34 knots (63 km/h; 39 mph). Three funnels were fitted and 296 long tons (301 t) of oil was carried, giving a design range of 3,450 nautical miles (6,390 km; 3,970 mi) at 15 knots (28 km/h; 17 mph). The ship had a complement of 80 officers and ratings.

Armament consisted of three single QF 4-inch (102 mm) Mk IV guns on the ship's centreline, with one on the forecastle, one aft on a raised platform and one between the middle and aft funnels. A single QF 2-pounder 40 mm (1.6 in) "pom-pom" anti-aircraft gun was carried, while torpedo armament consisted of two twin mounts for 21 in (533 mm) torpedoes. To combat submarines, the destroyer was fitted with racks and storage for depth charges. Initially, only two depth charges were carried but the number increased in service and by 1918, the vessel was carrying between 30 and 50 depth charges.

== Construction and career ==
Laid down on 1 March 1915 by William Doxford & Sons of Sunderland in the River Wear, Orestes was launched on 21 March 1916 and completed during October that year. The destroyer was the sixth Royal Navy ship to be named after Orestes, the son of Clytemnestra, husband of Hermione, and King of Argos in Greek mythology. The vessel was deployed as part of the Grand Fleet, joining the Fourteenth Destroyer Flotilla based at Scapa Flow Orestes was soon in action and, on 10 November 1916, joined sister ship Partridge and light cruiser Caroline in a search for the German merchant ship SS Brandenburg.

The destroyer was subsequently deployed in anti-submarine warfare based at the naval base in Portsmouth. On 1 February 1917, Orestes started to patrol off the coast of Cornwall in response to a sighting of the submarine SM U-55, which was deemed a threat to shipping. Fifteen days later, the destroyer attacked the submarine UC-65, but the enemy boat escaped unscathed. Patrols continued in the English Channel into the next month, but no further contact with submarines was made. On 12 March, the destroyer rescued survivors from Privet after the Q-ship had duelled with U-85 and both had been fatally damaged. The destroyer attempted to tow the stricken ship but was unsuccessful and Privet sank off Plymouth Sound.

Increasingly, patrols had not provided the security needed to shipping and the Admiralty redeployed the destroyers of the Grand Fleet to focus on the more effective convoy model. By 29 March, Orestes was one of only three left patrolling the North Sea seeking submarines. On 15 June, the vessel, along with the rest of the Fourteenth Destroyer Flotilla, was involved in a large sweep of the area west of the Shetland Islands searching for submarines, although Orestes was attached to the Eleventh Destroyer Flotilla. The destroyer did not sight any submarines. Shortly afterwards, the destroyer was transferred to the Northern Division of the Coast of Ireland Station at Buncrana. This allowed the destroyer to support the convoys travelling across the Atlantic Ocean from the American industrial complex at Hampton Roads to Britain. The harsh conditions of wartime operations, particularly the combination of high speed and the poor weather that is typical of the North Sea, exacerbated by the fact that the hull was not galvanised, meant that the destroyer soon worn out from such service.

After the armistice, the Royal Navy returned to a peacetime level of strength and Orestes was declared superfluous to operational requirements. The destroyer was initially transferred back to Portsmouth on 17 October 1919 and placed in reserve. However, this did not last long as the navy needed to reduce both the number of ships and the amount of staff to save money. Orestes was decommissioned and, on 30 January 1921, sold to W. & A.T. Burdon to be broken up.

== Pennant numbers ==
Pennant number	Date
G33	September 1915
G61	January 1917
G60	January 1918
D56	November 1918
H74	January 1919
