= HMS Pandour =

Four ships of the Royal Navy have borne the name HMS Pandour, after the Pandurs, an 18th-century force of Croatian soldiers (e.g. Trenck's Pandurs), who served the Habsburg monarchy as skirmishers and who had a reputation for brutality:

- HMS Pandour (1795) was the French 14-gun brig Pandour, launched in 1780, that the British captured in 1795 and renamed HMS Pandour or Pandora; she foundered in the North Sea in 1797.
- HMS Pandour, was the French 16-gun privateer ship-sloop Eugénie, which Magnanime captured in March 1798.The Royal Navy renamed her HMS Pandour, but never commissioned her. In 1800 she was renamed HMS Wolf and was broken up in 1802.
- HMS Pandour was the Dutch 44-gun frigate Hector, launched in 1784, that the British captured in 1799, fitted out and transferred to the Transport Board in 1800, commissioned in 1803, converted to a floating battery in 1804, and transferred to Customs as a store hulk in 1805. The Admiralty offered her for sale at Portsmouth in May 1814.
- HMS Pandour was a 22-gun Banterer-class post ship, begun under the name Pandour in 1805, but renamed HMS Cossack before being launched in 1806; she was broken up in 1816.
