= HMS Puncher =

Several ships of the British Royal Navy have been named HMS Puncher.

- HMS Puncher (D79) – an escort carrier of the Second World War, crewed by the Royal Canadian Navy
- HMS Puncher (L3036) – tank landing ship launched 1946 as LST 3036 and renamed Puncher 1947; sold and scrapped 1961
- HMS Puncher (P291) – a fast patrol boat
