= HMS Peony =

Two ships of the Royal Navy have borne the name HMS Peony, after the flower:

- HMS Peony (1915) was an Azalea-class sloop launched in 1915 and sold in 1919, becoming the mercantile Ardena.
- HMS Peony (K40) was a Flower-class corvette launched in 1940 and transferred to the Royal Hellenic Navy in 1943 as Sachtouris. She was returned in 1951 and scrapped in 1952.
