= HMS Oakham Castle =

Decommissioned Royal Navy corvette of the Castle class

- HMS Oakham Castle, c. 1947

History

United Kingdom
- Name: HMS Oakham Castle
- Namesake: Oakham Castle
- Builder: A & J Inglis, Glasgow
- Laid down: 30 November 1943
- Launched: 20 July 1944
- Completed: 10 December 1944
- Identification: Pennant number: K530
- Fate: Weather ship Weather Reporter 1957; Scrapped 1977

General characteristics
- Type: Castle-class corvette
- Displacement: 1,060 long tons (1,077 t)
- Length: 252 ft (77 m)
- Beam: 36 ft 8 in (11.18 m)
- Draught: 13 ft 6 in (4.11 m)
- Installed power: 2 × water-tube boilers; 2,750 ihp (2,050 kW)
- Propulsion: 1 × 4-cylinder triple-expansion steam engine; Single screw
- Speed: 16.5 knots (30.6 km/h; 19.0 mph)
- Range: 6,200 nmi (11,500 km) at 15 kn (28 km/h; 17 mph)
- Complement: 120
- Sensors & processing systems: Type 272 radar; Type 145 sonar; Type 147B sonar
- Armament: 1 × QF 4-inch Mk XIX gun; 1 × Squid anti-submarine mortar; 1 × Depth charge rail, 15 depth charges; 4–10 × 20 mm anti-aircraft cannon

HMS Oakham Castle, c. 1947.

HMS Oakham Castle (K530) was a Royal Navy corvette of the Castle class. Built as a convoy escort during the Second World War, it later became a weather ship before being scrapped in 1977.

== Design and construction ==
The Castle-class corvettes were an improved and enlarged derivative of the earlier Flower-class corvettes, which was intended to be built by shipyards that could not build the larger and more capable frigates. The greater length of the Castles gave made them better seaboats than the Flowers, which were not originally designed for ocean escort work. Large numbers (96 in total) were ordered in late 1942 and early 1943 from shipyards in the United Kingdom and Canada, but Allied successes in the Battle of the Atlantic meant that the requirement for escorts was reduced, and many ships (including all the Canadian ones) were cancelled.

The Castles were 252 feet 0 inches (76.81 m) long overall, 234 feet 0 inches (71.32 m) at the waterline and 225 feet 0 inches (68.58 m) between perpendiculars. Beam was 36 feet 6 inches (11.13 m) and draught was 13 feet 5 inches (4.09 m) aft at full load. Displacement was about 1,060 long tons (1,080 t) standard and 1,590–1,630 long tons (1,620–1,660 t) full load. Two Admiralty Three-drum water tube boilers fed steam to a Vertical Triple Expansion Engine rated at 2,750 indicated horsepower (2,050 kW) which drove a single propeller shaft. This gave a speed of 16.5 knots (19.0 mph; 30.6 km/h). 480 tons of oil were carried, giving a range of 6,200 nautical miles (7,100 mi; 11,500 km) at 15 knots (17 mph; 28 km/h).

The ships had a main gun armament of a single QF 4-inch Mk XIX dual-purpose gun, backed up by two twin and two single Oerlikon 20 mm cannon. Anti-submarine armament consisted of a single triple-barrelled Squid anti-submarine mortar with 81 charges backed up by two depth charge throwers and a single depth charge rail, with 15 depth charges carried. Type 272 or Type 277 surface search radar was fitted, as was high-frequency direction finding (HF/DF) gear. The ships' sonar outfit was Type 145 and Type 147B.

Oakham Castle was one of 13 Castle-class corvettes ordered on 19 December 1942. The ship was laid down at A & J Inglis's Glasgow shipyard on 30 November 1943, launched on 20 July 1944, and completed on 10 December 1944.

== Career ==
On entering service, Oakham Castle was employed on convoy escort duty in the North Atlantic.

In 1948, Oakham Castle joined the 2nd Training Squadron based at Portland Harbour, continuing to serve in this duty until December 1950, when she was reduced to reserve at Devonport. Oakham Castle was refitted in 1953, and then was laid up in a preserved condition at South Shields. The ship was transferred to the Met Office in 1957, and was converted to a Weather ship by James Lamont & Co. at Greenock. On 16 May 1958 the ship was renamed Weather Reporter by Lord Hurcomb. It was scrapped in 1977.

== See also ==
- Oakham Castle

== Publications ==
- Brown, David K. (2007). Atlantic Escorts: Ships, Weapons & Tactics in World War II. Barnsley, UK: Seaforth Publishing. ISBN 978-1-84415-702-0.
- Brown, David K. (2012). Nelson to Vanguard: Warship Design and Development 1923–1945. Barnsley, UK: Seaforth Publishing. ISBN 978-1-84832-149-6..
- Colledge, J. J.; Warlow, Ben (2006) [1969]. Ships of the Royal Navy: The Complete Record of All Fighting Ships of the Royal Navy from the 15th Century to the Present (3rd Rev ed.). London: Chatham Publishing. ISBN 978-1-86176-281-8. OCLC 67375475.
- Critchley, Mike (1992). British Warships Since 1945: Part 5: Frigates. Liskeard, UK: Maritime Press. ISBN 0-907771-13-0.
- Elliott, Peter (1977). Allied Escort Ships of World War II: A Complete Survey. London: Macdonald and Jane's. ISBN 0-356-08401-9.
- Friedman, Norman (2008). British Destroyers & Frigates: The Second World War and After. Barnsley, UK: Seaforth Publishing. ISBN 978-1-84832-015-4.
- Gardiner, Robert; Chesneau, Roger, eds. (1980). Conway's All The World's Fighting Ships 1922–1946. London: Conway Maritime Press. ISBN 0-85177-146-7.
