= HMS Plym =

Two ships of the Royal Navy have borne the name HMS Plym, after the River Plym:

- HMS Plym (1795) was a gunvessel, previously a hired packet brig. She was fitted out in 1795 and sold in 1802.
- HMS Plym (K271) was a River-class frigate launched in 1943. She was vaporised in Operation Hurricane, the atomic bomb test in 1952.
