= HMS Portsmouth =

Numerous ships of the British Royal Navy have been named HMS Portsmouth, after the English port city and home of a naval base.

- English ship Portsmouth (1650), Portsmouth during the English Commonwealth, a 38-gun fourth-rate frigate launched in 1650 and exploded after being captured by the French ship Marquis 1689.
- HMS Portsmouth (1665), a 14-gun ketch launched in 1665 and captured in 1673 by the Dutch Navy.
- HMS Portsmouth (1667), a 6-gun sloop launched in 1667 and captured in 1672 by the Dutch Navy.
- HMS Portsmouth (1674), an 8-gun yacht launched in 1674 and wrecked in 1703.
- HMS Portsmouth (1690), a 32-gun fifth rate launched in 1690 and captured by the French Navy in 1696.
- HMS Portsmouth (1702), a 6-gun yacht launched in 1702, rebuilt and renamed HMS Medina in 1772 and broken up in 1832.
- HMS Portsmouth (1707), a 42-gun fifth rate launched in 1707, converted to a hospital ship in 1720 and broken up in 1728.
- HMS Portsmouth (1741), a storeship launched in 1741 and wrecked in 1747 off Longsands.
- HMS Portsmouth (1742), a 6-gun yacht launched in 1742 and broken up in 1869.
- HMS Portsmouth (1747), a transport purchased in 1747 and sold in 1767.
- HMS Portsmouth (1756), a 6-gun busse purchased in 1756 and wrecked off Senegal in 1758.
- HMS Portsmouth (1759), a 4-gun transport launched in 1759.
- HMS Portsmouth (1811), an Aid-class storeship launched in 1811, converted to a coal hulk in 1828 and broken up in 1834.

== See also ==
- HMS Portsmouth Prize, a sixth rate French ship captured in 1694 and recaptured by the French in 1696.
- Commonwealth ship Portsmouth Shallop, a French 4-gun sloop captured in 1655, and captured by Royalists later that year.
