= HMS Primula =

Two vessels of the Royal Navy have been named HMS Primula:

- HMS Primula (1915), an Arabis-class sloop launched on 6 December 1915 and torpedoed and sunk in the Mediterranean Sea by U-35 on 1 March 1916.
- HMS Primula (K14), a Flower-class corvette launched on 22 June 1940 and sold on 22 July 1946.
