= HMS Privet =

There have been at least two ships of the Royal Navy named HMS Privet:

- HMS Privet (1916), built as the merchantman Island Queen in 1916 and taken up a Q-ship during World War I.
- HMS Privet (1942), a Flower-class corvette which was intended for the Royal Navy but was delivered to the U.S. Navy as USS Prudent in 1942.
