= HMS Oxford Castle =

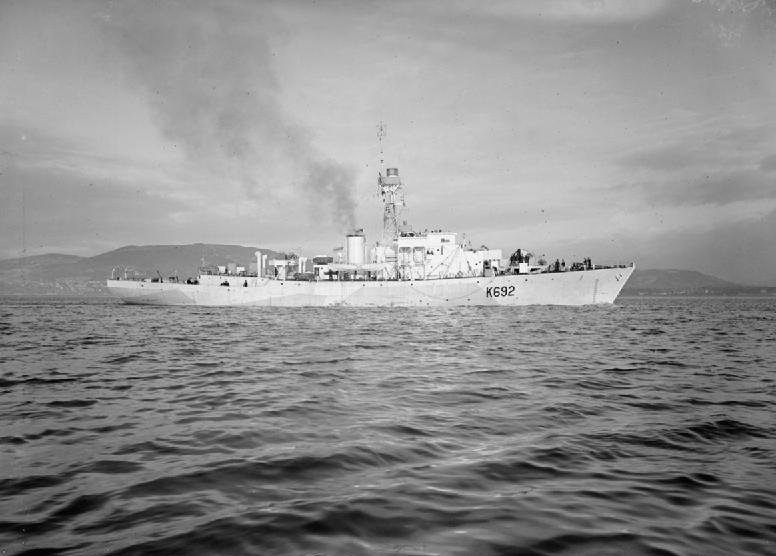
- Oxford Castle in March 1944

History

United Kingdom
- Name: Oxford Castle
- Namesake: Oxford Castle
- Builder: Harland & Wolff, Belfast
- Yard number: 1238
- Laid down: 21 June 1943
- Launched: 11 December 1943
- Completed: 10 March 1944
- Commissioned: 10 March 1944
- Decommissioned: 1946
- Identification: Pennant number: K692
- Fate: Sold for scrap, March 1960

General characteristics (as built)
- Class & type: Castle-class corvette
- Displacement: 1,010 long tons (1,030 t) (standard)
- Length: 252 ft (76.8 m)
- Beam: 33 ft (10.1 m)
- Draught: 13 ft 9 in (4.2 m) (deep load)
- Installed power: 2 Admiralty 3-drum boilers; 2,880 ihp (2,150 kW)
- Propulsion: 1 shaft, 1 triple-expansion engine
- Speed: 16.5 knots (30.6 km/h; 19.0 mph)
- Range: 6,500 nmi (12,000 km; 7,500 mi) at 15 knots (28 km/h; 17 mph)
- Complement: 99
- Sensors & processing systems: Type 145 and Type 147 ASDIC; Type 272 search radar; HF/DF radio direction finder
- Armament: 1 × QF 4 in (102 mm) DP gun; 2 × twin, 2 × single 20 mm (0.8 in) AA guns; 1 × 3-barrel Squid anti-submarine mortar; 1 × depth charge rail and 2 throwers; 15 depth charges

HMS Oxford Castle (K692) was a Castle-class corvette built for the United Kingdom's Royal Navy during the Second World War. Completed in early 1944, she spent the war escorting 20 convoys between the UK and Gibraltar. The ship was placed in reserve in 1946 and remained in that status aside from a brief interlude serving as a training ship in 1950 until she was sold for scrap in 1960.

== Design and description ==
The Castle-class corvette was a stretched version of the preceding Flower class, enlarged to improve seakeeping and to accommodate modern weapons. The ships displaced 1,010 long tons (1,030 t) at standard load and 1,510 long tons (1,530 t) at deep load. The ships had an overall length of 252 feet (76.8 m), a beam of 36 feet 9 inches (11.2 m) and a deep draught of 13 feet 9 inches (4.2 m). They were powered by a four-cylinder triple-expansion steam engine driving one propeller shaft using steam provided by two Admiralty three-drum boilers. The engine developed a total of 2,880 indicated horsepower (2,150 kW) and gave a speed of 16.5 knots (30.6 km/h; 19.0 mph). The Castles carried fuel oil that gave them a range of 6,500 nautical miles (12,000 km; 7,500 mi) at 15 knots (28 km/h; 17 mph). The ships' complement was 99 officers and ratings.

The Castle-class ships were equipped with a single QF 4-inch (102 mm) Mk XVI dual-purpose gun forward, but their primary weapon was their single three-barrel Squid anti-submarine mortar. This was backed up by one depth charge rail and two throwers for 15 depth charges. The ships were fitted with two twin and a pair of single mounts for 20-millimetre (0.8 in) Oerlikon AA guns. Provision was made for a further four single mounts if needed. They were equipped with Type 145Q and Type 147B ASDIC sets to detect submarines by reflections from sound waves beamed into the water. A Type 272 search radar and a HF/DF radio direction finder rounded out the Castles' sensor suite.

== Construction and career ==
Oxford Castle was ordered on 23 January 1943 and was laid down at Harland & Wolff at their shipyard in Belfast, Northern Ireland on 21 June. The ship was launched on 11 December 1943, commissioned on 23 February 1944, and completed on 10 March. After several weeks of training in Western Approaches Command's Anti-Submarine Training School at Tobermory, Mull, she arrived at Liverpool on 30 March to join Escort Group B2 on the Gibraltar–UK run. Oxford Castle continued on this duty through the surrender of Germany in May 1945, although she was transferred to B22 Escort Group in September 1944, and then to the Liverpool Escort Pool three months later. The ship arrived at Liverpool on 10 June 1945 after her last convoy dispersed.

She spend most of the rest of the year at Rosyth and was placed in reserve in February 1946. Oxford Castle was reactivated in 1949 and completed a refit in February 1950. The ship was then assigned to the Anti-Submarine Training Flotilla based at Rosyth until she was again reduced to reserve in 1951. Oxford Castle was offered for sale in November 1956, but there were no takers. The ship was sold for scrap to Thos. W. Ward in March 1960 and arrived at Briton Ferry on 6 September to begin demolition.

== Bibliography ==
- Campbell, N. J. M. (1980). "Great Britain (including Empire Forces)". In Chesneau, Roger (ed.). Conway's All the World's Fighting Ships 1922–1946. Conway Maritime Press. pp. 2–85. ISBN 0-85177-146-7.
- Colledge, J. J.; Warlow, Ben & Bush, Steve (2020). Ships of the Royal Navy: The Complete Record of all Fighting Ships of the Royal Navy from the 15th Century to the Present (5th revised and updated ed.). Seaforth Publishing. ISBN 978-1-5267-9327-0.
- Goodwin, Norman; compiled by (2007). Castle Class Corvettes: An Account of the Service of the Ships and of Their Ships' Companies. Maritime Books. ISBN 978-1-904459-27-9.
- Lenton, H. T. (1998). British & Empire Warships of the Second World War. Naval Institute Press. ISBN 1-55750-048-7.
