= HMS Prospero (1837) =

19th c. British paddle steamer and Admiralty packet

History

United Kingdom
- Name: Belfast
- Namesake: Belfast
- Owner: David Napier and John Gemmill
- Port of registry: Glasgow, Scotland
- Route: Glasgow-Greenock-Belfast
- Builder: John Wood & Co, Port Glasgow
- Launched: August 1829
- Maiden voyage: September 1829
- Out of service: 1837

History

United Kingdom
- Name: HMS Prospero
- Namesake: Prospero
- Acquired: 1837
- Fate: Broken up 1866

General characteristics
- Type: wood-hulled paddle steamer
- Displacement: 244 tons
- Tons burthen: 180 tons burthen
- Length: 116 ft 8 in (35.56 m)
- Beam: 18 ft 0 in (5.49 m)
- Installed power: 150 hp (110 kW) nominal
- Propulsion: 2-cylinder beam engine

HMS Prospero was a wood-hulled British paddle steamer built in 1829 on the River Clyde at Port Glasgow as Belfast for service between Glasgow and Belfast. In 1837 she was purchased by the Admiralty to run as HMS Prospero on the packet service between Pembroke and Ireland. She was broken up in 1866.

== Construction ==
Belfast was launched in August 1829 at the Port Glasgow shipyard of John Wood & Co. With a wooden hull, her side-paddles were powered by a two-cylinder beam engine of 150 hp (110 kW) nominal, made by David Napier at Camlachie, Glasgow. Belfast's initial tonnage was given as 180 tons burthen by Builder's Old Measurement and 123 tons nrt; she was 116 ft 8 in (35.56 m) long, with a beam of 18 ft 0 in (5.49 m).

== Glasgow-Belfast service ==
The steamer Belfast was built for operation by John Gemmill, who had pioneered the steamer route between Glasgow and Dublin in 1826 with his ships Erin and Scotia, and been involved in the Glasgow-Belfast trade since at least 1823. She was owned by David Napier, her engine builder, and arrived at Belfast on her first voyage on 2 September 1829. In mid-1830 Glasgow shipowners J & G Burns bought out John Gemmill's Belfast service, but continued to operate Belfast on the same route.

== Admiralty packet ==
On 4 August 1837 Belfast was sold to the Admiralty for service on its mail-carrying service to Ireland. She was sent to Pembroke Dockyard for alterations and was recorded as 244 tons by Builder's Old Measurement, 129 ft 6 in (39.47 m) long, a beam of 20 ft 4 in (6.20 m) and depth of 11 ft 5 in (3.48 m). She had a crew of 12 and was armed with a single 12-pdr carronade on a travelling carriage.

HMS Prospero began service between Pembroke and Waterford on 2 October 1837. Within a few months she was nearly lost. On 15 February 1838, after a crossing from Pembroke in heavy gales, she was prevented her entering Waterford until they abated. During the night the gale increased to a hurricane, carrying away her paddleboxes, causing a leak and putting her engine out of service, though the crew were able to contain the leak. Adrift, she would have probably been totally wrecked but for "the providential circumstance of a heavy sea carrying the vessel safely over the bar" into the comparative shelter of Youghal harbour. She left Youghal on 22 February after hull and engine repairs, and resumed service, then in October was sent to Woolwich Dockyard for a thorough overhaul.

The ship was given new boilers at Holyhead in March 1841.

Prospero was based at Pembroke for nearly 30 years, initially as a steam packet and, from 1853, as dockyard tender, tug and occasional coastal transport. In October 1866, Prospero was sold to Messrs Marshall for demolition at Plymouth.
