= SS Justicia =

Large First World War troop ship, sunk in 1918

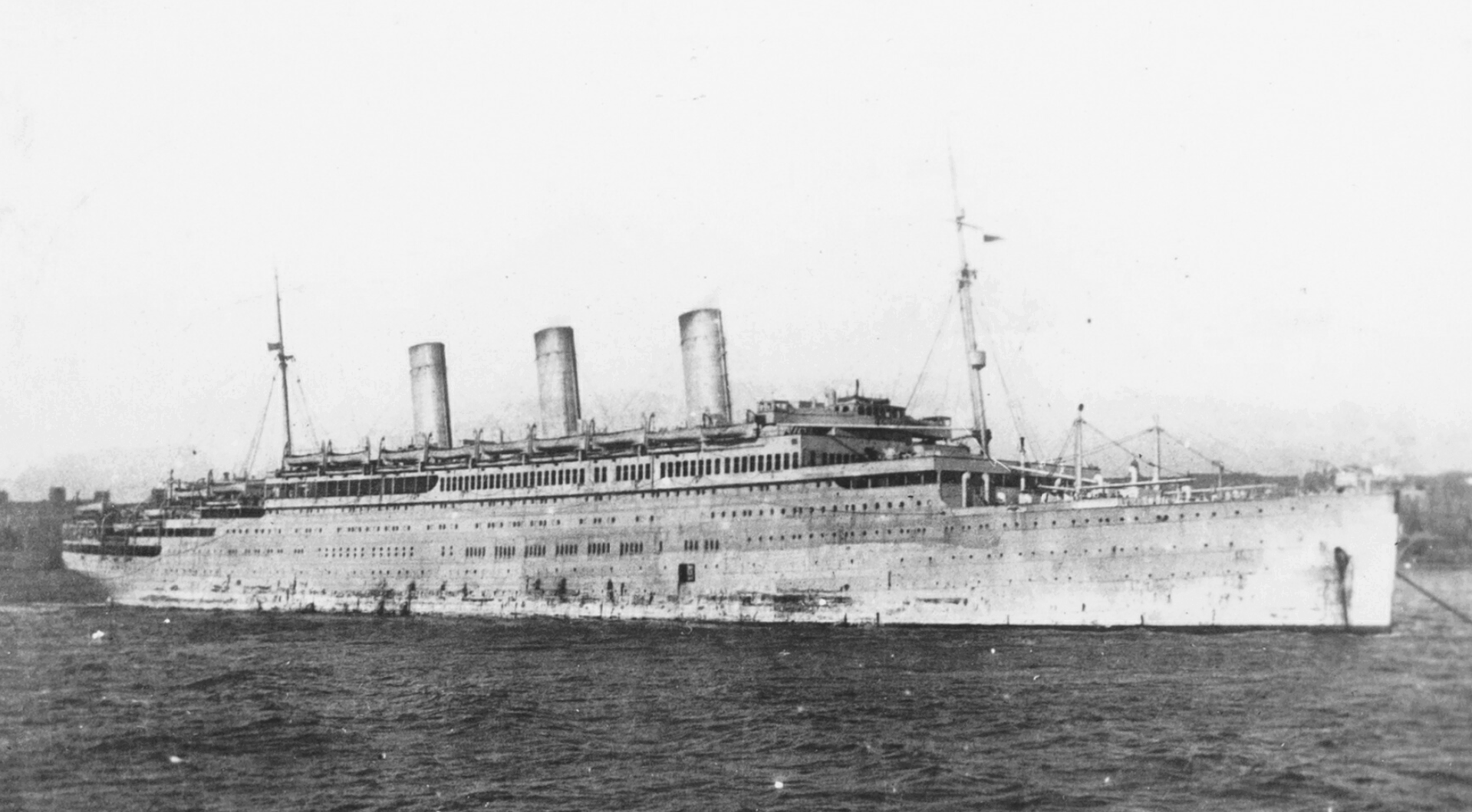
- Justicia in wartime grey

History

United Kingdom
- Name: 1914: Statendam; 1917: Justicia
- Namesake: 1917: Lady Justice
- Owner: Oceanic Steam Navigation Co
- Operator: White Star Line
- Port of registry: Liverpool
- Builder: Harland & Wolff, Belfast
- Yard number: 436
- Laid down: 1912
- Launched: 9 July 1914
- Completed: 7 April 1917
- Identification: UK official number 137544; code letters JPFL
- Fate: Sunk by six torpedoes, 1918

General characteristics
- Type: Troop ship
- Tonnage: 32,120 GRT, 19,699 NRT
- Length: 740.5 ft (225.7 m)
- Beam: 86.4 ft (26.3 m)
- Depth: 43.1 ft (13.1 m)
- Installed power: 2,903 NHP, 22,000 ihp
- Propulsion: 3 × Propeller; 2 × Triple expansion engines; 1 × Low-pressure steam turbine
- Speed: 17 knots (31 km/h)
- Troops: About 4,000
- Crew: 600
- Armament: Naval gun on poop deck

SS Justicia was a British troop ship that was launched in Ireland in 1914 and sunk off County Donegal in 1918. She was designed and launched as the transatlantic liner Statendam, a new flagship for the Holland America Line (NASM), but the outbreak of First World War delayed her completion. In 1915 NASM agreed to let the United Kingdom acquire her and have her completed as a troop ship.

The ship was completed in 1917 and renamed Justicia, with the intention that Cunard Line would crew and operate her. However, Cunard was unable to raise a crew for her, so the Shipping Controller appointed White Star Line to manage her.

Justicia entered service in April 1917, carrying troops from North America to Europe. She escaped a U-boat attack in January 1918, but sank that July off the coast of Ireland after two U-boats hit her with a total of six torpedoes.

The ship was 90 ft (27 m) longer and 9 ft (3 m) broader than NASM's then flagship, the 24,149 GRT Rotterdam, which Harland & Wolff had completed in 1908. Statendam would have been by far the largest NASM had yet owned. Only HAPAG's Imperator class, White Star Line's Olympic class and Cunard's Aquitania were larger. As it was, Justicia became the second largest ship sunk by enemy action in the First World War. The only one larger than Justicia was the 48,148 GRT HMHS Britannic.

Justicia shared the same combined propulsion system as several other H&W liners of her era including Laurentic and Belgenland.

Justicia's wreck is in the territorial waters of the Republic of Ireland and protected by Irish law.

== Design ==
NASM and H&W planned Statendam to be a modern ship with berths for 800 passengers in first class, 600 in second and 2,030 in third, with a crew of 600. The first class saloon was to be 20 ft (6 m) high, making it the largest of its type on an ocean liner of its era. Décor was to be modern, in contrast with the historicist styles then commonly favoured by British and German shipping lines.

As a troop ship, Justicia was reconfigured to carry 4,000 or 5,000 men, but in practice this was sometimes greatly exceeded. Her holds had capacity for 15,000 tonnes of cargo. Her registered length was 740.5 ft (225.7 m), her beam was 86.4 ft (26.3 m) and her depth was 43.1 ft (13.1 m). Her tonnages were 32,120 GRT and 19,699 NRT.

Justicia was one of a series of H&W steamships that were propelled by a combination of reciprocating steam engines and a steam turbine. She had three screws. A pair of four-cylinder triple expansion engines drove her port and starboard screws. Exhaust steam from those engines powered one low-pressure turbine that drove her middle screw. H&W had used this arrangement first on Laurentic for White Star Line. Justicia had three funnels, only two of which were flues for her boilers. The third was a dummy, included purely for aesthetic reasons.

With the exception of the three Olympic-class liners, Justicia was one of the largest and most powerful ships ever built with this combination of reciprocating and turbine engines. Her reciprocating engines were the same size as those in Belgenland, but her total power rating was higher. Between them, Justicia's three engines were rated at a total of 2,903 NHP or 22,000 ihp and gave her a speed of 17 knots (31 km/h). This was an economical speed for peacetime service, but not quick enough for her to sail unescorted in wartime.

== Building and acquisition ==
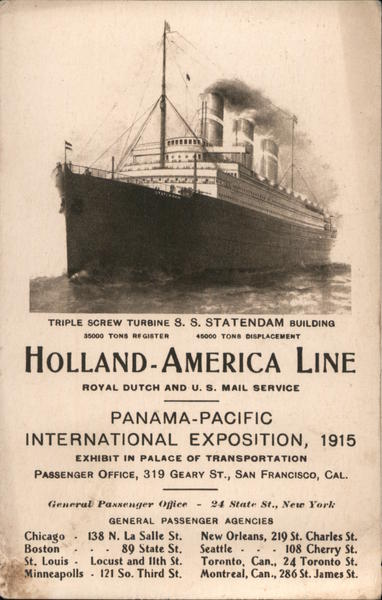
Postcard that NASM published for the 1915 Panama–Pacific International Exposition, with an artist's impression of how Statendam would look when completed

Harland & Wolff built Statendam on slipway number 3 (the same as Titanic from 1909 to 1911) as yard number 436. Her keel plates were laid down in 1912 and she was launched on 9 July 1914. However, the First World War broke out on 28 July, and the UK joined on 4 August. Work on Statendam was slowed down to let H&W concentrate on more urgent war-related work. However, the fact that her construction was well advanced offered potential for her to be completed for war service.

In October 1914, the UK Admiralty offered NASM £1,000,000 for use of the ship, with a guarantee to return it at the end of the war. Decorative elements already installed were removed, as was customary when converting passenger liners into troop ships. In Statendam's case they were sent to Rotterdam for storage. H&W completed the ship slowly, taking special measures to adapt her to war service. Unlike her contemporaries Belgenland and Orca, H&W completed Justicia with her dummy funnel.

In 1915 the UK government requisitioned the still-incomplete ship. It offered her to Cunard to replace Lusitania, which had been sunk in May 1915. The name Justicia means "justice", and conforms with Cunard policy of giving its ships a name ending with -ia. However, Cunard was unable to raise a complete crew for her.

In November 1916, a mine sank the hospital ship HMHS Britannic, which left White Star Line with enough crew to work Justicia. White Star's engineer officers and men, unlike those of Cunard, were experienced with "combination machinery" such as that in Justicia. The Shipping Controller therefore transferred Justicia to the Oceanic Steam Navigation Company (White Star Line). However, the ship was not renamed to conform with White Star policy of giving its ships names ending with -ic.

Justicia was completed in plain grey paint. On 7 April 1917 White Star Line took delivery of her. She was registered in Liverpool in 1917. Her UK official number was 137544 and her code letters were JPFL.

== Service and loss ==
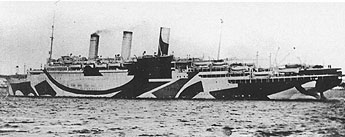
Justicia in dazzle camouflage

White Star Line ran Justicia across the North Atlantic, bringing troops to Liverpool first from Halifax, Nova Scotia and then from New York. At the beginning of 1918 she was painted with dazzle camouflage developed by Norman Wilkinson. She was attacked soon after, on 23 January 1918, by a German submarine in the North Channel, but no torpedo hit her, and she was undamaged.

On 19 July 1918 Justicia left Belfast for New York, escorted by destroyers. She was unladen, and her Master was Hugh Frederick David. 20 miles off Skerryvore, Scotland, UB-64 hit her with one torpedo, at first mistaking her for USS Leviathan. Justicia developed a list, but the watertight doors in her bulkheads were closed in time and kept her afloat. UB-64 fired two torpedoes, but Justicia's guns destroyed one of them, and the other missed. The tug Sonia took Justicia in tow, heading for Lough Swilly. UB-64 fired a fourth torpedo, but Justicia's gunners destroyed it. UB-64 then fired a fifth torpedo, which hit Justicia but did not sink her. Part of Justicia's crew was evacuated, and Sonia continued to tow her. The escorts damaged UB-64, which withdrew, but reported Justicia's position via wireless telegraph.

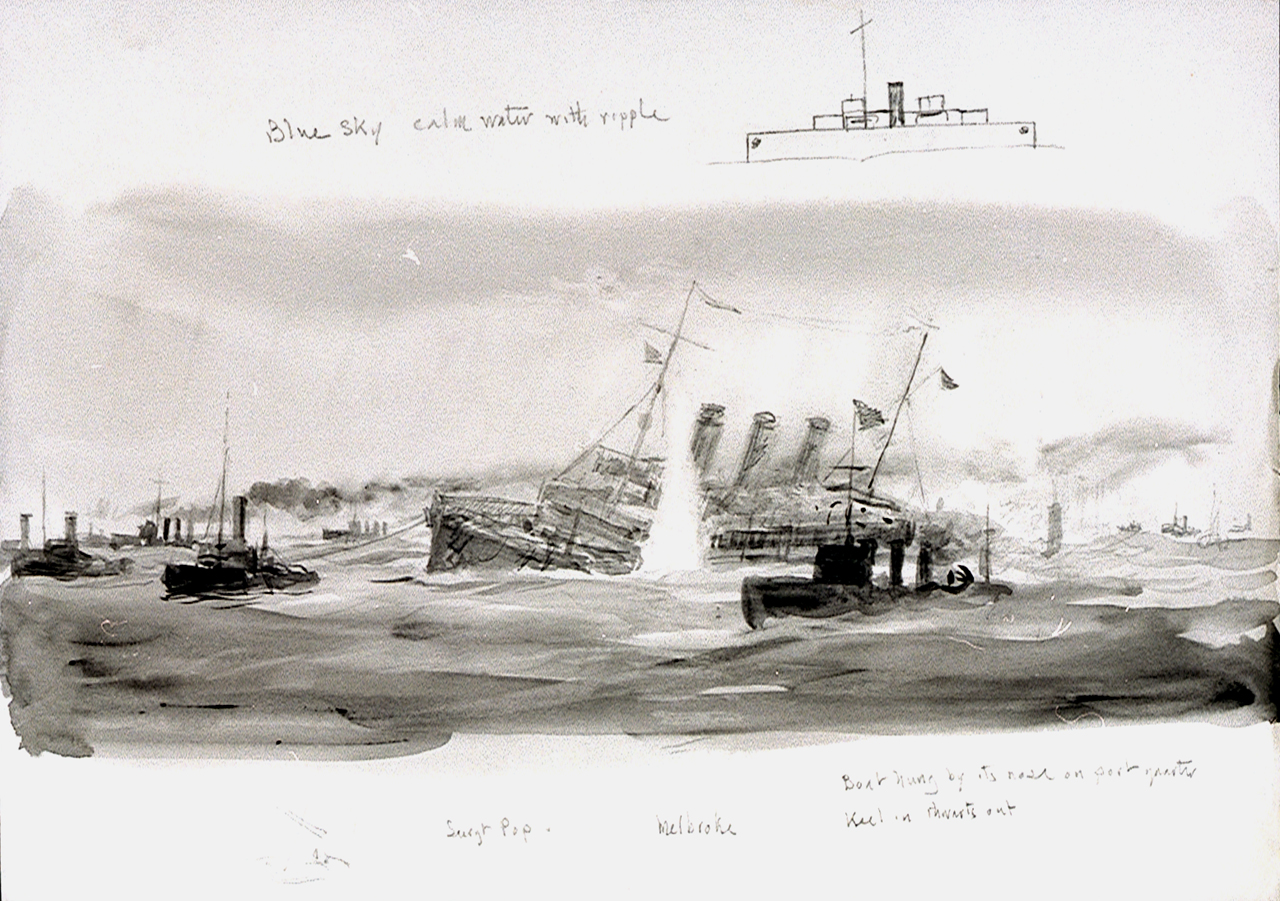
Study by the artist WL Wyllie of the tug Sonia trying to tow Justicia to Lough Swilly

The next morning, 20 July, UB-124 found Justicia and hit her amidships with two torpedoes, killing either 10 or 16 of her engine room crew (sources differ). Her surviving crew were evacuated, and by noon she rolled onto her starboard side and sank. The destroyers HMS Marne, Milbrook, and Pigeon depth charged UB-124, forcing her to the surface, and then sank her by gunfire.

The German press celebrated the sinking. The Royal Navy held an inquiry to establish how the U-boats could have sunk a ship that was escorted by at least three destroyers. The inquiry concluded that the German submariners' determination and bravery were "beyond belief".

The UK government compensated NASM with 60,000 tonnes of steel, which it used to build a fleet of cargo ships. In 1921 NASM ordered a new Statendam from Harland & Wolff. She was launched in 1924 but her completion was delayed until 1929.

== Wreck ==
Justicia's wreck lies at a depth of 230 ft (70 m), 21 nautical miles (38 km) northwest of Malin Head at 55°39′47″N 7°43′13″W. The wreck is orientated north – south, and has an average height of 10 ft (3 m). It is very broken, but her bow is largely intact, with its starboard anchor still visible in its hawse. Her bridge superstructure is collapsed to port. Her 12 Scotch boilers, two reciprocating engines and single steam turbine are visible. Her stern is fairly broken up, but her rudder quadrant and the gun on her poop deck remain visible.

Being in the territorial waters of the Republic of Ireland and more than a century old, the wreck is automatically protected by the National Monuments (Amendment) Act, 1987, section 3, sub-section (4). Divers must obtain a licence from the Department of Tourism, Culture, Arts, Gaeltacht, Sport and Media before diving on the wreck.

== Bibliography ==
- Bonsor, NRP (1975). North Atlantic Seaway. Vol. 2. Jersey: Brookside Publications. p. 766. ISBN 978-0905824017.
- Buxton, Ian (2008) [1978]. Big Gun Monitors: The History of the Design, Construction and Operation of the Royal Navy's Monitors. Barnsley: Seaforth Publishing. ISBN 978-1-84415-719-8.
- de Kerbrech, Richard (2009). Ships of the White Star Line. Shepperton: Ian Allan Publishing. ISBN 978-0-7110-3366-5.
- Eaton, John; Haas, Charles (1989). Falling Star, Misadventures of White Star Line Ships. Patrick Stephens Ltd. ISBN 1-85260-084-5.
- "Supplement". Lloyd's Register of Shipping. Vol. II–Steamers. London: Lloyd's Register of Shipping. 1917 – via Internet Archive.
- Mercantile Navy List. 1918 – via Crew List Index Project.
- Williams, David; de Kerbrech, Richard (1982). Damned by Destiny. Brighton: Teredo books. ISBN 0-903662-09-4. OCLC 10284842.
