= HMS Mosquito (1910) =

Destroyer of the Royal Navy

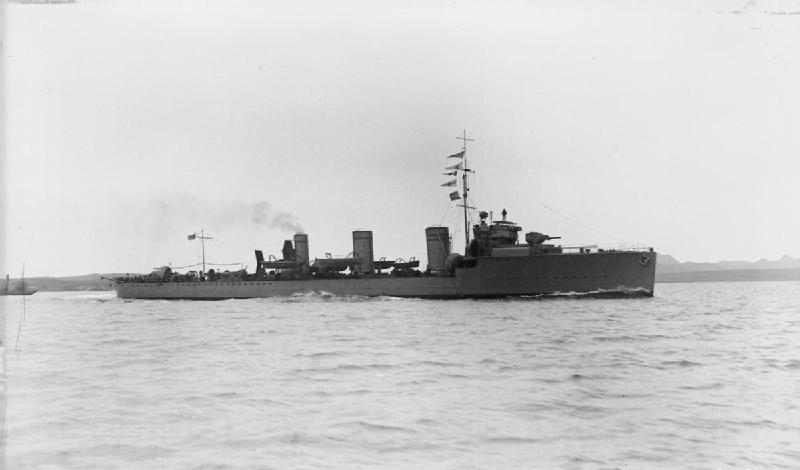
- Sister ship Scourge

History

United Kingdom
- Name: HMS Mosquito
- Builder: Fairfield Shipbuilding & Engineering Company, Govan
- Laid down: 22 April 1909
- Launched: 27 January 1910
- Completed: 11 August 1910
- Out of service: 31 August 1920
- Fate: Sold to the broken up

General characteristics
- Class & type: Beagle-class destroyer
- Displacement: 925 long tons (940 t)
- Length: 271 ft (83 m)
- Beam: 27 ft 10 in (8.48 m)
- Draught: 16 ft 6 in (5.03 m)
- Installed power: 12,000 hp (8,900 kW) under a forced draught
- Propulsion: 5 x coal-fired Yarrow boilers, 3 x Parsons steam turbines driving 3 shafts
- Speed: 27 knots (50 km/h; 31 mph)
- Range: 2,000 nautical miles (3,700 km; 2,300 mi) at 15 knots (28 km/h; 17 mph)
- Complement: 96
- Armament: 1 × 4 in (102 mm) BL Mark VIII naval gun; 3 × 3 in (76 mm) QF 12 pdr 12 cwt Mark I; 2 × single 21 in (533 mm) torpedo tubes

HMS Mosquito was a Beagle-class (or G-class) destroyer of the British Royal Navy. The Beagle class were coal-fuelled ships, designed for a speed of 27 kn (31 mph; 50 km/h) and armed with a 4 in (102 mm) gun and two torpedo tubes. Built by Fairfield Shipbuilding & Engineering Company at their Govan yard and launched in 1910, Mosquito was transferred to the Mediterranean Fleet in 1913, and spent most of the First World War in the Mediterranean. While participating in the Gallipoli campaign, the destroyer rescued the crew of the French battleship Bouvet, sunk by a naval mine. The vessel was transferred to Buncrana in the north of Ireland in 1917 and acted as an escort to convoys. In 1918, the destroyer helped to rescue survivors from the troopship Tuscania, sunk by a German U-boat. After the Armistice that ended the war, Mosquito was initially transferred to the Nore and then sold in 1920 to be broken up.

== Design and development ==
Mosquito was one of three Beagle-class destroyers ordered from Fairfield Shipbuilding and Engineering Company as part of the 1908–1909 shipbuilding programme. The vessels were coal-burning after concerns had been raised about the availability of fuel oil in time of war and the bridge was larger and higher than previous designs. This reduced costs, although it also meant that five boilers were needed, the extra machinery meaning that deck space became more premium. Otherwise, the Beagle-class vessels were not built to a standard design, with detailed design being left to the builders of individual ships in accordance with a loose specification. The vessels were known as the G class from October 1913.

Mosquito was 271 feet (82.6 m) long, with a beam of 27 feet 10 inches (8.5 m) and a draught of 16 feet 6 inches (5.0 m). Normal displacement was 925 long tons (940 t), which increased to 983 long tons (999 t) by the end of the First World War. Five Yarrow boilers fed direct-drive Parsons steam turbines driving three shafts. Two funnels were fitted. The machinery was rated at 12,000 shp (8,900 kW) giving a design speed of 27 kn (31 mph; 50 km/h). The destroyer reached a speed of 27.12 kn (31.21 mph; 50.23 km/h) during sea trials. Up to 226 long tons (230 t) of coal was carried, giving a design range of 2,000 nautical miles (3,700 km; 2,300 mi) at 15 knots (28 km/h; 17 mph).

Armament consisted of one 4 in (100 mm) BL Mk VIII gun forward and three 3 in (76 mm) QF 12-pounder 12 cwt guns aft. (Note: "Cwt" is the abbreviation for hundredweight, 12cwt referring to the weight of the gun.) Torpedo armament consisted of two 21 in (530 mm) torpedo tubes, one placed forward and the other aft. Two spare torpedoes were carried. On 8 April 1916, the Admiralty approved fitting the destroyer with depth charges. Initially, two charges were carried. This was increased to 30 to 50 charges during 1918. The ship had a complement of 96 officers and ratings.

== Construction and career ==
Mosquito was laid down at Fairfield Shipbuilding and Engineering Company's Govan shipyard on 22 April 1909, was launched on 27 January the following year and completed on 11 August. The ship was the eleventh of the name to serve in the Royal Navy, including one in Australian service. The vessel joined the First Destroyer Flotilla. In 1912, a reorganisation of the Home Fleet resulted in the ships of the Beagle class forming the Third Destroyer Flotilla. Mosquito remained part of the Third Flotilla in March 1913. The Flotilla was based at Plymouth. On 19 November 1913, Mosquito left for Malta and joined the Fifth Destroyer Flotilla as part of the Mediterranean Fleet.

At the start of the First World War, the destroyer was part of the Second Division of the Fifth Destroyer Flotilla and based at Alexandria. On 18 August, the destroyer was deployed to Suez to deter the Ottoman Empire from restricting British access to the Suez Canal. The ship escorted the ex-Union-Castle Line troopship Grantully Castle carrying the Suffolk Regiment from Port Sudan to Suez on 9 October. On 10 November, the destroyer was deployed to Port Sudan to deter the Ottoman army from being reinforced from Africa.

In 1915 Mosquito participated in the naval operations in the Dardanelles Campaign. On the night of 1/2 March, along with Basilisk, Grasshopper and Racoon, the destroyer escorted trawlers attempting to clear the minefields across the narrows of the Dardanelles straits. The force came under heavy fire from Turkish guns, and were forced to turn back before reaching the minefields. On the night of the 18/19 March, the destroyer was involved in another attempt to clear the mines, this time escorting three trawlers and two picket boats. Once again, they had to turn back under heavy fire. It was then decided to clear the minefields by day while the British and French battleships suppressed the Turkish guns that protected the minefields. This was attempted on 18 March, with Basilisk, Grasshopper, Mosquito and Racoon again escorting the minesweeping trawlers. The attempt failed, however, with the fire from mobile guns forcing the minesweepers to turn back. Even more consequentially, the battleships Bouvet, Ocean and Irresistible hit mines and sank, the destroyer rescuing the majority of the survivors from Bourvet.

Mosquito was still based in the Mediterranean in August 1917, However, by October that year, the vessel had moved to the Second Destroyer Flotilla, based at Buncrana in the north of Ireland. The Admiralty redeployed the destroyers as escorts to convoys to protect them from German submarines. On 5 February 1918, Mosquito was part of the escort for Convoy HX 20, bound from Halifax, Nova Scotia, to Liverpool when the troopship Tuscania was torpedoed by the German submarine UB-77 south west of Islay. Mosquito was one of three destroyers detached from the convoy to rescue survivors from the sinking troopship and rescued about 200 men, while Pigeon rescued about 800 and Grasshopper about 500. A total of 166 American soldiers and 44 members of Tuscania's crew were killed. Mosquito was still part of the Second Destroyer Flotilla in May 1918, but by July had returned to the Fourth Destroyer Flotilla at Devonport, remaining there until the end of the war.

After the Armistice that ended the war, the Royal Navy quickly withdrew all pre-war destroyers from active service. By February 1919, Mosquito was transferred had moved to The Nore. However, that deployment did not last long. As the force returned to a peacetime level of strength, both the number of ships and personnel needed to be reduced to save money. Mosquito as declared superfluous to operational requirements, retired, and, on 31 August 1920, was sold to Ward at Rainham to be broken up.

== Pennant numbers ==
Pennant numbers
Pennant number	Date
HA3	January 1918
H29	January 1919
