= HMS Mounsey (1915) =

Royal Navy Yarrow M-class destroyer

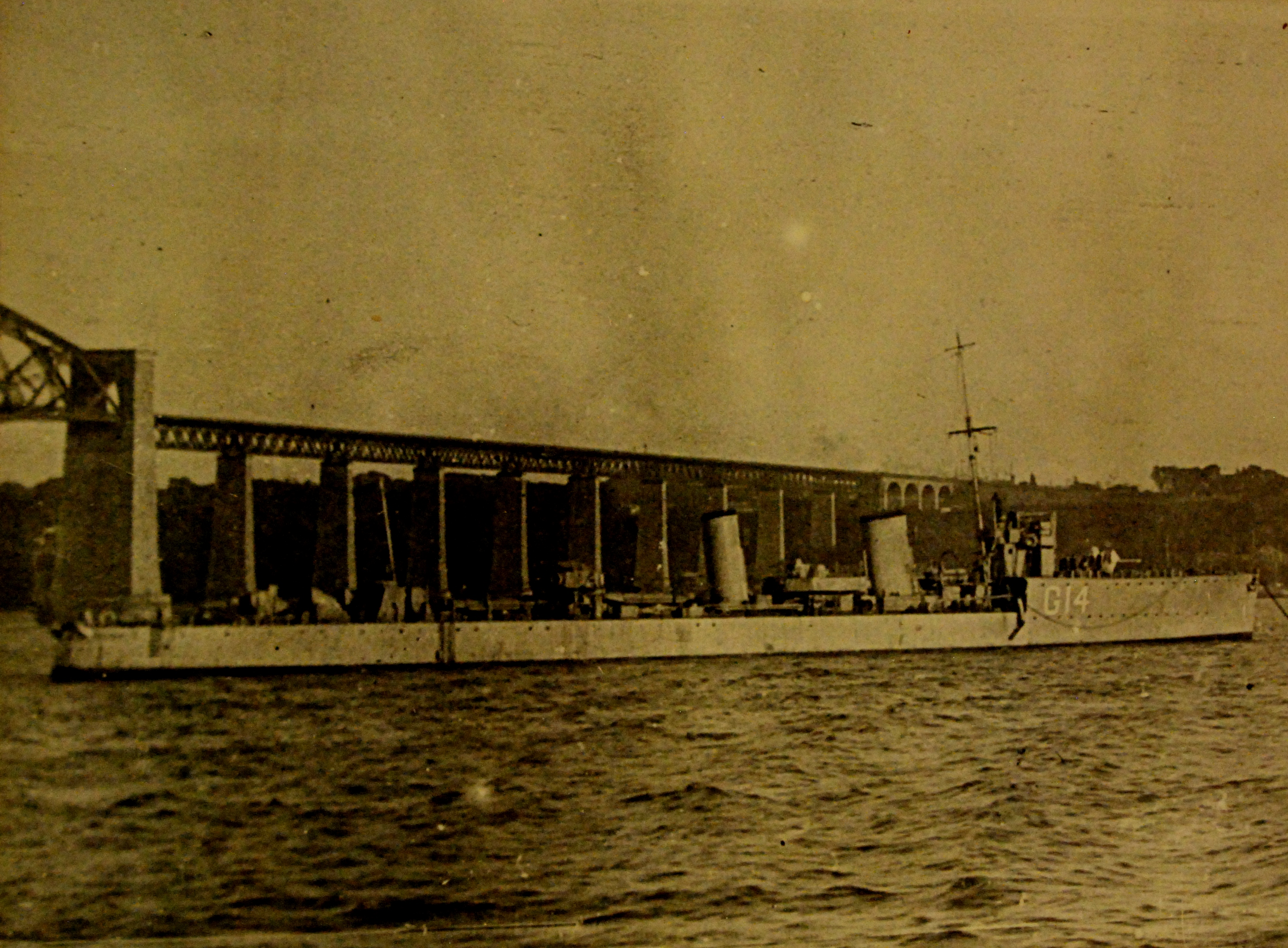

History

United Kingdom
- Name: HMS Mounsey
- Builder: Yarrow, Scotstoun
- Laid down: 18 October 1914
- Launched: 11 September 1915
- Completed: November 1915
- Fate: Sold 8 November 1921

General characteristics
- Class & type: Yarrow M-class destroyer
- Displacement: 879–893 long tons (893–907 t)
- Length: 271 ft 6 in (82.75 m) oa
- Beam: 25 ft 7 1/2 in (7.81 m)
- Draught: 10 ft 8 in (3.25 m)
- Installed power: 23,000 shp (17,000 kW)
- Propulsion: 3× Yarrow boilers; Brown-Curtis steam turbines; 2 shafts
- Speed: 35 kn (40 mph; 65 km/h)
- Complement: 76
- Armament: 3 × 4-inch (102 mm) guns; 2 × 2-pounder (40 mm) guns; 4 × 21 inch (533 mm) torpedo tubes

HMS Mounsey was a Yarrow M-class destroyer of the British Royal Navy. Built by the Scottish shipbuilder Yarrow in 1914–1915, Mounsey served in the Grand Fleet during the First World War, and took part in the Battle of Jutland. The following year she saw combat against German submarines, and in 1918 she helped rescue crew and passengers aboard the damaged troopship Otranto. She was sold for scrap in 1921.

== Design and construction ==
The M-class destroyers were designed to meet a requirement for faster destroyers than the previous Laforey-class, in order to match reported German ships. They hoped for a speed of 36 knots (41 mph; 67 km/h), but otherwise, the requirements were similar to those that gave rise to the Laforeys. As part of its 1913–1914 shipbuilding programme, the Admiralty ordered six ships to the standard Admiralty design, together with seven builder's specials from the experienced destroyer builders Yarrow, Thornycroft and Hawthorn Leslie, to the builder's own designs. The outbreak of the First World War resulted in a series of large orders being placed for destroyers to replace expected losses, with the existing M-class being chosen for orders rather than new designs to speed production. Twenty M-class destroyers were ordered in September 1914 as part of the First Emergency War Programme, with the order consisting of 16 Admiralty M-class ships and four Yarrow specials. (Note: Moon, Morning Star, Mounsey and Musketeer.)

Mounsey was 271 feet 6 inches (82.75 m) long overall and 260 feet 3 inches (79.32 m) between perpendiculars, with a beam of 25 feet 7 1/2 inches (7.81 m) and a draught of 10 feet 8 inches (3.25 m). Displacement of the Yarrow specials was 879–893 long tons (893–907 t). (Note: Mounsey displaced 835 long tons (848 t) during sea trials.) Three Yarrow water-tube boilers fed steam to Brown-Curtis impulse steam turbines, driving two propeller shafts. Two funnels were fitted, a distinguishing feature of the Yarrow specials. The machinery was rated at 23,000 shaft horsepower (17,000 kW) giving a speed of 35 knots (40 mph; 65 km/h).

The ships were armed with three 4-inch (102 mm) QF Mk 4 guns, together with two 2-pounder pom-pom anti-aircraft autocannons. Two twin 21-inch (533mm torpedo tubes were fitted. The ships had a crew of 80.

Mounsey, named for Captain William Mounsey, was laid down at Yarrow's Scotstoun shipyard on 18 October 1914 and launched on 11 September 1915. She reached a speed of 39.018 kn (44.901 mph; 72.261 km/h) over the measured mile and 38.605 kn (44.426 mph; 71.496 km/h) over four hours during sea trials and was completed in November 1915.

== Service ==
By January 1916, Mounsey had joined the 11th Destroyer Flotilla, part of the Grand Fleet. On 18 March 1916, the sighting of a submarine off the entrance to Lough Swilly in the north of Ireland led to a suspension of all sea traffic through the North Channel. Mounsey and sister ship Mons, which had just finished refitting on the Clyde, were briefly stopped from returning to their base at Scapa Flow until orders were clarified.

Mounsey took part in the Battle of Jutland, departing from Cromarty on 30 May with most of the rest of the 11th Flotilla in support of the 2nd Battle Squadron. The 11th Flotilla clashed several times with German forces during the night of 31 May/1 June, with Mounsey undamaged. Mounsey, together with the destroyer Moon, was detached from the Fleet on the afternoon of 1 June to escort the battleship Valiant to Rosyth.

On 13 April 1917, the Admiralty intercepted radio signals from the German submarine U-50, indicating that the submarine UC-30 has suffered failure of one of her engines, and was making her way back to Germany from St Kilda at a speed of 3 kn (3.5 mph; 5.6 km/h). Mounsey was ordered to lead five more destroyers to patrol off the north of Scotland to intercept UC-30 early on 14 April, and later that day sighted a submarine that dived away to safety (which was probably the British submarine G9, also searching for UC-30). While UC-30 evaded the searching British forces, the submarine never returned home, possibly sunk by a mine. On 24 June 1917, Mounsey and the destroyer Opal were escorting an east-bound convoy on the Scandinavian (Lerwick–Norway) route, when the convoy came under attack by the German submarine U-67, which fired two torpedoes from distance at the convoy, one of which hit and sank the Swedish merchant ship Viking. In response, Opal followed back the track of the torpedo and dropped a depth charge on the estimated location of the submarine, but U-67 escaped unharmed. On 30 July, Mounsey was again escorting an east-bound convoy from Lerwick when she sighted a submarine at a distance of about 12 nmi (14 mi; 22 km). Mounsey made for the submarine, which dived away, but later that day the submarine U-60 torpedoed and sank the Norwegian Canis from the convoy.

Mounsey remained part of the 11th Flotilla in March 1918, but in April that year transferred to the 3rd Destroyer Flotilla, still attached to the Grand Fleet. In May 1918, Monsey moved again, this time to the 2nd Destroyer Flotilla, assigned to the Coast of Ireland Station and based at Buncrana in the north of Ireland.

On 6 October 1918, the troopship Otranto, part of a convoy carrying American troops to Europe, collided with the liner Kashmir in heavy seas in the North Channel. Otranto was badly damaged and was soon forced to stop by flooding, and had drifted close to the coast of Islay by the time that Mounsey arrived in response to Otranto's distress signal. Mounsey was unable to come alongside Otranto to take off Otranto's crew and passengers owing to the very heavy seas, and instead, her commanding officer, Lieutenant Francis Craven, took the destroyer as close as possible on Otranto's lee side so that men could jump over to Mounsey. Craven took Mounsey alongside Otranto four times in total, rescuing 596 of Otranto's passengers and crew before, with no more room for any more survivors and damaged by impacts with the side of the troopship, was forced to break off the rescue attempts and make for port. Otranto ran aground on Islay about 30 minutes after Mounsey left, killing 431. Craven was awarded the Distinguished Service Order for Mounsey's rescue efforts.

== Disposal ==
Mounsey was paid off by December 1918, and had moved to Devonport by February 1919. Mounsey was sold for scrap to Slough Trading Company on 8 November 1921 and broken up in Germany. (Note: Slough Trading Company acted as an agency for German shipbreakers.)

== Pennant numbers ==
Pennant number	Dates
H0C	1915–January 1917
G14	January 1917–April 1918
HC0	April 1918–June 1918
G1A	June 1918–

== Bibliography ==
- Campbell, John (1998). Jutland: An Analysis of the Fighting. London: Conway Maritime Press. ISBN 978-0-85177-750-4.
- Corbett, Julian S. (1920). Naval Operations: Volume III. History of the Great War. London: Longmans, Green and Co. OCLC 1049894619.
- Dittmar, F. J.; Colledge, J. J. (1972). British Warships 1914–1919. Shepperton, UK: Ian Allan. ISBN 0-7110-0380-7.
- Dorling, Taprell (1932). Endless Story: Being an account of the work of the Destroyers, Flotilla-Leaders, Torpedo-Boats and Patrol Boats in the Great War. London: Hodder and Stoughton.
- Friedman, Norman (2009). British Destroyers: From Earliest Days to the Second World War. Barnsley, UK: Seaforth Publishing. ISBN 978-1-84832-049-9.
- Gardiner, Robert; Gray, Randal, eds. (1985). Conway's All The World's Fighting Ships 1906–1921. London: Conway Maritime Press. ISBN 0-85177-245-5.
- "H.M.T.B Destroyer Mounsey". Journal of the American Society of Naval Engineers. XXXI (1): 240–241. January 1919.
- Kemp, Paul (1997). U-Boats Destroyed: German Submarine Losses in the World Wars. London: Arms & Armour Press. ISBN 1-85409-321-5.
- McBride, Keith (1991). "British 'M' Class Destroyers of 1913–14". In Gardiner, Robert (ed.). Warship 1991. London: Conway Maritime Press. pp. 34–49. ISBN 0-85177-582-9.
- Manning, T. D. (1961). The British Destroyer. London: Putnam. OCLC 6470051.
- Manning, T. D.; Walker, C. F. (1959). British Warship Names. London: Putnam.
- Monograph No. 31: Home Waters Part VI: From October 1915 to May 1916 (PDF). Naval Staff Monographs (Historical). Vol. XV. Naval Staff, Training and Staff Duties Division. 1926.
- Monograph No. 34: Home Waters Part VIII: December 1916 to April 1917 (PDF). Naval Staff Monographs (Historical). Vol. XVIII. Naval Staff, Training and Staff Duties Division. 1933.
- Monograph No. 35: Home Waters Part IX: 1st May 1917 to 31st July 1917 (PDF). Naval Staff Monographs (Historical). Vol. XIX. Naval Staff, Training and Staff Duties Division. 1939.
