= HMS Milbrook (1915) =

British M-Class destroyer

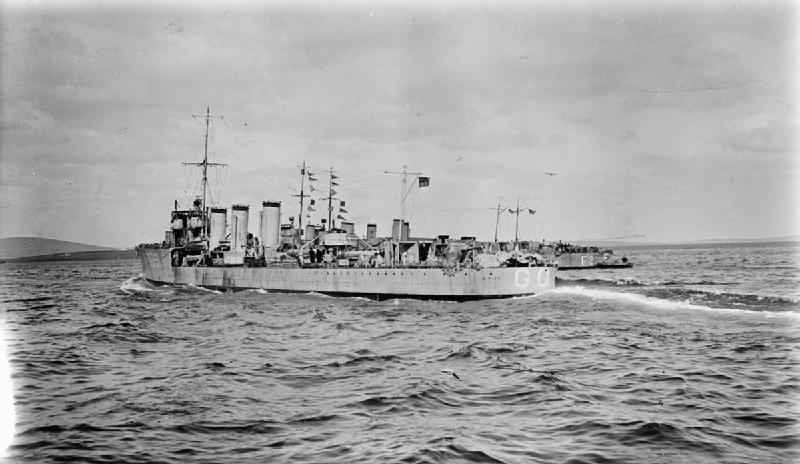
- Sister ship Minion

History

United Kingdom
- Name: Milbrook
- Ordered: September 1914
- Builder: Thornycroft, Woolston, Southampton
- Laid down: November 1914
- Launched: 12 July 1915
- Completed: October 1915
- Out of service: 22 September 1921
- Fate: Sold to be broken up

General characteristics
- Class & type: Admiralty M-class destroyer
- Displacement: 976 long tons (992 t) (normal)
- Length: 273 ft 4 in (83.3 m) (o/a); 265 feet (80.8 m) (p.p.)
- Beam: 26 ft 8 in (8.1 m)
- Draught: 8 ft 11 in (2.7 m)
- Installed power: 3 Yarrow boilers, 25,000 shp (19,000 kW)
- Propulsion: Parsons steam turbines, 3 shafts
- Speed: 34 knots (63 km/h; 39 mph)
- Range: 2,530 nmi (4,690 km; 2,910 mi) at 15 kn (28 km/h; 17 mph)
- Complement: 80
- Armament: 3 × single QF 4-inch (102 mm) guns; 2 × single 1-pdr 37 mm (1.5 in) AA guns; 2 × twin 21 in (533 mm) torpedo tubes

HMS Milbrook was an Admiralty M-class destroyer which served in the Royal Navy during the First World War. The M class was an improvement on those of the preceding L class, capable of higher speed. The destroyer was launched in 1915 and joined the Eleventh Destroyer Flotilla of the Grand Fleet. In 1916, Milbrook responded with the Grand Fleet to the bombardment of Yarmouth and Lowestoft and fought in the Battle of Jutland. During the following year, the warship was transferred to Buncrana to operate under the Commander-in-Chief, Coast of Ireland and, for the remainder of the war, the destroyer escorted convoys that were arriving and departing ports on the Clyde and Mersey to cross the Atlantic. In 1918, the ship was jointly responsible for the destruction of the German submarine UB-124. After the Armistice, Milbrook was placed in reserve before being sold to be broken up in 1921.

== Design and development ==
At the start of the First World War, the Royal Navy envisaged heavy destroyer losses and so instigated a War Programme to quickly construct new warships. Milbrook was one of the sixteen Admiralty M-class destroyers ordered by the British Admiralty in September 1914 as part of the First War Programme. The M class was an improved version of the earlier L class, required to reach a higher speed in order to counter rumoured new German fast destroyers. The remit was to have a maximum speed of 36 knots (67 km/h; 41 mph) and, although ultimately the destroyers fell short of that ambition in service, the extra performance that was achieved was valued by the navy. It transpired that the rumoured German warships did not exist

The destroyer had a length of 265 ft (80.8 m) between perpendiculars and 273 ft 4 in (83.3 m) overall, with a beam of 26 ft 8 in (8.1 m) and draught of 8 ft 11 in (2.7 m). Normal displacement was 976 long tons (992 t). Power was provided by three Yarrow boilers feeding Parsons steam turbines rated at 25,000 shaft horsepower (19,000 kW), driving three shafts and exhausting through three funnels. Design speed was 34 knots (63 km/h; 39 mph), but Milbrook only managed 32.75 knots (60.65 km/h; 37.69 mph) on 22,750 shp (16,960 kW) during trials. A total of 228 long tons (232 t) of oil was carried, which gave a design range of 2,530 nautical miles (4,690 km; 2,910 mi) at 15 knots (28 km/h; 17 mph). The ship had a complement of 80 officers and ratings.

Milbrook had a main armament consisting of three single QF 4-inch (102 mm) Mk IV guns on the centreline, with one on the forecastle, one aft on a raised platform and one between the middle and aft funnels. Torpedo armament consisted of two twin torpedo tubes for 21 in (533 mm) torpedoes located aft of the funnels. Fire control included a single Dumaresq and a Vickers range clock. Two single 1-pounder 37 mm (1.5 in) "pom-pom" anti-aircraft guns were carried. The anti-aircraft guns were later replaced by single 2-pdr 40 mm (1.6 in) "pom-pom" guns. The destroyer was also fitted with racks and storage for depth charges. Initially, only two depth charges were carried but the number increased in service and by 1918, the vessel was carrying between 30 and 50 depth charges.

== Construction and career ==
Milbrook was laid down by John I. Thornycroft & Company at their yard in Woolston, Southampton in November 1914, was launched on 12 July the following year and was completed three months later in October 1915. Unlike others built by the shipyard, the destroyer was built to an Admiralty specification. The vessel was the second to enter Royal Navy service to be given the name.

Milbrook was deployed as part of the Grand Fleet, joining the Eleventh Destroyer Flotilla. On 26 and 27 February 1916, the flotilla took part in a large naval exercise east of Shetland, involving four flotillas of destroyers, as well as all the operational battlecruisers, battleships and cruisers of the Grand Fleet. The exercise was deemed a success. On 24 April, the destroyer was based at Cromarty on the east coast of Scotland. The flotilla formed part of the support for the Grand Fleet in their response to the German bombardment of Yarmouth and Lowestoft which took place on that day. However, the slower speed of the destroyers in the choppy seas meant that they were left behind and they did not encounter the German fleet.

During the following month, the destroyer sailed back to Cromarty along with eight other destroyers from the flotilla and the flotilla leader Kempenfelt to meet with the Second Battle Squadron. The ships sortied to rendezvous with the remainder of the Eleventh Destroyer Flotilla under the light cruiser Castor on 31 May. They then sailed along with the rest of the Grand Fleet to confront the German High Seas Fleet in the Battle of Jutland. As the two fleets converged, the flotilla was briefly called away hunt for what would transpire as non-existent submarines. Before they met, the flotilla was formed close to the dreadnought battleship King George V, which was leading at the head of the Second Battle Squadron. At 21:00, the destroyers encountered heavy German units and very nearly attacked, but broke off due to fears they were British battlecruisers. As the German fleet withdrew during the night, the destroyers, led by Castor, are believed to have come under fire from SMS König at 23:45. They attacked the German light cruisers of the Fourth Scouting Group, although Milbrook again was not able to achieve any hits. The engagement led them away from the battle, opening the way for the German fleet to escape. In the action, Milbrook took no hits. After the battle ended, the vessel returned to Scapa Flow with the remainder of the flotilla, arriving on 2 June.

The destroyer remained part of the Eleventh Destroyer Flotilla on 19 August, based at Scapa Flow. During the following year, Milbrook was transferred to the Northern Division of the Coast of Ireland Station based at Buncrana. The destroyer was part of the escort service provided to convoys travelling across the Atlantic. The destroyers at Buncrana assisted convoys travelling across the Atlantic Ocean to and from the American industrial complex at Hampton Roads and via Sydney, Nova Scotia, arriving and departing ports on the Clyde and Mersey. The division also provided three escorts every eight days to protect fast convoys travelling to and from Halifax, Nova Scotia. The convoy escort role continued into 1918. On 20 July, the destroyer, along with sister ships Marne and Pigeon, successfully drove the German submarine UB-124 to the surface with depth charges. The ships then sank the submarine with gunfire.

After the Armistice that ended the war on 11 November 1918, the Royal Navy returned to a peacetime level of strength and both the number of ships and personnel needed to be reduced to save money. The destroyer was transferred to reserve at Portsmouth. However, the harsh conditions of wartime operations, particularly the combination of high speed and the poor weather that is typical of the North Sea, exacerbated by the fact that the hull was not galvanised, meant that the ship was soon worn out. Milbrook was declared superfluous to operational requirements, retired, and, on 22 September 1921, was sold to Cohen, and broken up in Germany.

== Pennant numbers ==
Pennant number	Date
HC6	August 1915
G08	January 1917
HA2	January 1918
G24	January 1919
