= HMS Otranto =

Armed merchant cruiser requisitioned by the Royal Navy in 1914

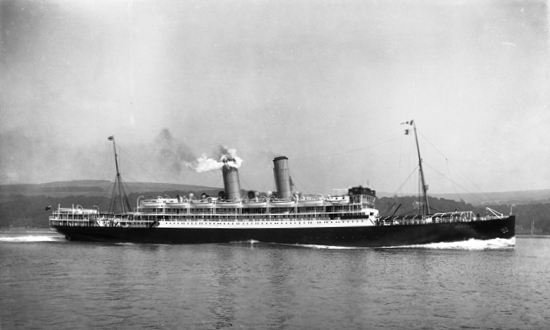
- Otranto in Orient Line service, 1909

History

United Kingdom
- Name: Otranto
- Namesake: Otranto
- Owner: Orient Steam Navigation Company
- Operator: Orient Steam Navigation Company
- Port of registry: London
- Route: London – Australia
- Ordered: c. 1908
- Builder: Workman, Clark and Company, Belfast
- Yard number: 278
- Laid down: c. 1908
- Launched: 27 March 1909
- Completed: 20 July 1909
- Maiden voyage: 1 October 1909
- Identification: UK official number 124675; Code letters HPKD; Call sign MOD
- Fate: Requisitioned, 4 August 1914

United Kingdom
- Name: Otranto
- Acquired: 4 August 1914
- Commissioned: 14 August 1914
- Identification: Pennant number: 1914: M 60; 1918: MI 87
- Fate: Sank after collision, 6 October 1918

General characteristics
- Type: Ocean liner / AMC
- Tonnage: 12,124 GRT, 7,433 NRT
- Length: 535 ft 4 in (163.2 m)
- Beam: 64 ft (19.5 m)
- Depth: 38 ft 8 in (11.8 m)
- Installed power: 14,000 ihp (10,000 kW)
- Propulsion: 2 × screw propellers; 2 × quadruple-expansion engines
- Speed: 18 knots (33 km/h; 21 mph)
- Capacity: Passengers: 235 1st class; 186 2nd class; 696 3rd class
- Armament: 8 × 4.7 in (120 mm) guns

HMS Otranto was an armed merchant cruiser requisitioned by the British Admiralty when World War I began in 1914. Built before the war for the UK–Australia run as SS Otranto, she was primarily used in the war to search for German commerce raiders. She played small roles in the Battle of Coronel in November 1914 when the German East Asia Squadron destroyed the British squadron searching for it and in the Battle of the Falkland Islands the following month when a British squadron annihilated the Germans in turn.

Apart from brief refits in the UK, Canada and Australia, she remained on this duty until early 1918 when she became a troop ship. During a severe storm off the Isle of Islay in late 1918, she accidentally collided with another troop ship, HMS Kashmir (1915) and was forced ashore by the storm, killing 470 passengers, mainly American soldiers, and crewmen.

== Description ==
Otranto had an overall length of 555 feet 6 inches (169.3 m), a beam of 64 feet (19.5 m), and a moulded depth of 38 feet 8 inches (11.8 m). She had tonnages of 12,124 gross register tons (GRT) and 7,433 net register tons (NRT). The ship was powered with a pair of four-cylinder quadruple-expansion steam engines, each driving one propeller. The engines had a total power of 14,000 indicated horsepower (10,000 kW) and gave Otranto a top speed of 18 knots (33 km/h; 21 mph). The ship had a capacity of 235 first-class, 186 second-class and 696 third-class passengers.

By 1913 Otranto was equipped for wireless telegraphy, operating on the 300 and 600 metre wavelengths. Her call sign was MOD.

== Construction ==
Otranto, named after the Strait of Otranto between Italy and Albania, was built by Workman, Clark and Company at its Belfast shipyard as yard number 278. She was built for the Orient Steam Navigation Company's England to Australia run. The first attempt to launch the ship failed on 23 March 1909 as the tallow used to lubricate the slipway had frozen and Otranto ground to a halt after sliding only 20 feet (6.1 m). Attempts to persuade her to resume her progress with hydraulic jacks failed and the slipway had to be partially rebuilt before she was successfully launched four days later. She was completed on 20 July and departed London on her maiden voyage to Brisbane, Australia, on 1 October.

== Passenger service ==
Otranto had made two round-trips to Australia by January 1910, and then made a 17-day cruise in the Mediterranean.

The arrival of the British mails was always important to Australia, and the installation of wireless telegraphy equipment, even more so. It was reported on 13 July 1910 as follows:

ARRIVAL OF THE OTRANTO. Well up to cabled time, the R.M.S. Otranto arrived from London, via ports, early yesterday morning, and, after being granted pratique, made fast to the quay a little before 9 o'clock Captain Coad reported an uneventful voyage. Fine weather was experienced to Cape Guardafui, but from that point to Minikoi Island a strong south-west monsoon was met with. After leaving Colombo moderate south-east trades were encountered accompanied by a heavy southerly swell. The Otranto is the first of the new Orient liners to be fitted with wireless, and during her present trip she was able to maintain communication with 23 shore stations and 45 steamers. A full account of the Johnson-Jeffries fight was received from the Macedonia's operator on Monday. The Otranto, after discharging cargo, resumed her voyage to the Eastern States at 3.30 o'clock in the afternoon. MAILS BY THE OTRANTO. One hundred and forty-two packages of parcel posts and 1,690 bags of mails comprise the total shipment of mails brought to hand by the R.M.S. Otranto. Western Australia's proportion consists of 164 bags, whilst the balance is distributed as follows:— Adelaide, 125; Melbourne, 272; Geelong, 8; Ballarat, 18; Bendigo, 10; New South Wales, 346; Queensland, 169; Tasmania, 45; New Zealand, 495; H.M. fleet, 18; Noumea, 30. THE OTRANTO'S OFFICERS. Captain A. J. Coad. of the R.M.S. Otranto, has associated with him this voyage the following officers:— L. S. Brooke-Smith, first officer; H. G. C. Adams, second officer; J. J. Hayes, third officer; E. E. Smith, fourth officer; C. J. Hill, fifth officer; H. Newman, purser; H. E. Bloxsome, surgeon; G. T. Greig, chief engineer; E. F. Jeffrey, assistant purser.

She resumed her London–Australia runs into early 1910. That year, the company was awarded a contract to carry mail and she was redesignated as RMS Otranto, the RMS standing for Royal Mail Ship. She was present at King George V's Coronation Naval Review on 26 June and made several voyages to the Norwegian fjords before mid-September when she returned to the Australia run, on which she remained until war was declared on Germany on 4 August 1914.

== Auxiliary cruiser ==
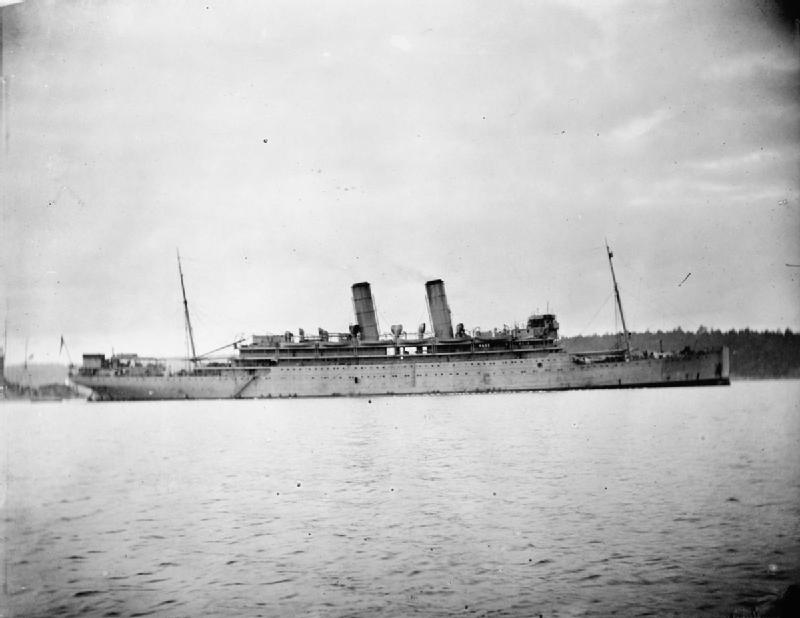
HMS Otranto in WWI

=== Conversion ===
The Admiralty requisitioned Otranto on that same day for conversion to an armed merchant cruiser, having eight quick-firing (QF)4.7 in (120 mm) guns fitted. A rangefinder was installed on the bridge and her fore and aft holds were refitted as magazines. Half-inch (12.7 mm) steel plating was added to protect her steering gear and her interior cabin bulkheads and glass ventilators were removed to reduce damage from splinters. Her furniture was removed to make room for the mess decks needed to feed large numbers of troops and sailors and an operating room and sickbay were installed amidships.

=== Naval duties commence ===
The work was completed on 13 August and she was commissioned as HMS Otranto the next day. The ship departed the UK on 17 August, the second armed merchant cruiser to leave England, with sealed orders that assigned her to Rear Admiral Sir Christopher Cradock's West Indies Squadron in the South Atlantic. Otranto rendezvoused with the squadron on 27 August off the coast of Brazil where she patrolled the coast of South America between Chile and Montevideo, Uruguay, fruitlessly searching for German commerce raiders, together with the armoured cruisers Good Hope, Monmouth and the light cruiser Glasgow.

Otranto accompanied Cradock and three cruisers to patrol the Strait of Magellan and the Chilean coast for German ships in mid-September. They failed to locate any of the German ships, but Otranto intercepted messages that indicated that German warships were operating in the area. Cradock concentrated his ships on the southwestern coast of South America in mid-October to prevent the East Asia Squadron under Vice Admiral Maximilian von Spee from breaking through into the South Atlantic. In mid-October Otranto struck a rock while departing Port Legunas, Chile, but a diver from Monmouth reported that it had done very little damage.

=== Battle of Coronel ===
On 27 October Cradock ordered Otranto to investigate Puerto Montt for signs of German ships and sent Glasgow to Coronel, Chile, to pick up any information from the Admiralty. The latter ship heard very strong radio transmission from the light cruiser SMS Leipzig four days later and Cradock brought his other ships north to rendezvous off Coronel. He ordered Glasgow to return to Coronel to transmit his appreciation of the situation to the Admiralty and collect any orders from them. The latter ship rejoined the squadron on the afternoon of 1 November and Cradock formed his ships into a line at 15 nautical miles (28 km; 17 mi) intervals to search for any Germans. At this time, both sides thought that they were in pursuit of a single light cruiser as a German merchantman had reported Glasgow's presence in Coronel to von Spee earlier in the day.

Glasgow was the first British ship to sight the East Asia Squadron at 16:20 and Otranto confirmed the spotting five minutes later. Cradock reformed the squadron into a line-ahead formation with Otranto in the rear and steered south to intercept the Germans. Due to the heavy weather and head sea, Otranto could make no more than 15 knots (28 km/h; 17 mph). After taking fire from the light cruiser SMS Dresden and the armoured cruiser SMS Gneisenau, her commander, Captain Edwards, ordered Otranto out of line, away from the Germans, and headed west at her best speed as she had no value against the German cruisers. Glasgow was the only other British ship to survive the battle.

Otranto was ordered to Montevideo to rendezvous with Rear Admiral Archibald Stoddart's squadron and arrived there on 10 November. She patrolled the Brazilian coast and east to Sierra Leone for the next month before arriving at Port Stanley in the Falkland Islands on 16 December to serve as the islands' guard ship. There she remained until 4 February 1915 when she returned to the UK where she arrived at Birkenhead on 10 March to begin a refit where her 4.7-inch guns were replaced an equal number of 6-inch (152 mm) weapons.

On 18 June, Otranto arrived at Punta Arenas, Chile to patrol the Pacific coast of South America. She remained on that duty for the next six months before departing on 18 December, via Easter Island, for Sydney, Australia for a refit at the Garden Island Dockyard. She arrived there on 14 January 1916 and departed on 5 March to return to her previous duty station. She arrived at Valparaíso, Chile, on 30 March and resumed her patrols. The ship received another refit at Esquimault, British Columbia, Canada, from October to December before leaving for the western coast of South America on 29 December. She arrived at Santa Elena, Ecuador, on 12 January 1917 and resumed her patrols. The ship arrived at Esquimalt for another refit on 2 October and arrived back at Santa Elena on 8 January 1918.

Otranto arrived at Rio de Janeiro, Brazil, on 30 April and helped to salvage the cargo liner Highland Scot that had run aground on Ilhas das Maricás in the harbour on 6 May. On 16 May she escorted a convoy of 10 freighters to the UK where she arrived on 16 June. She then began a brief refit at HM Dockyard, Devonport. The ship arrived in New York City on 20 July where contractors fitted her with troop accommodations. Otranto departed on 8 August for her first trooping voyage and arrived at Liverpool on 20 August where she remained for several days before arriving back at New York City on 8 September.

=== Last voyage and sinking ===
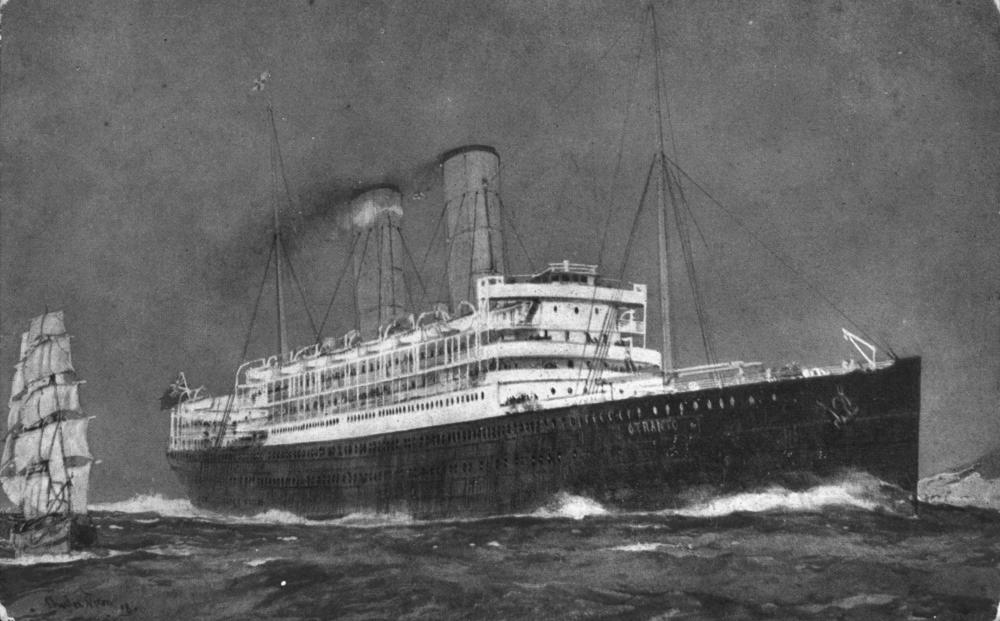
Painting of the passenger ship Otranto

Serving as the convoy flagship for Convoy HX 50, Otranto departed New York on 25 September. Six days later, on the evening of 1 October, the ship accidentally rammed the French fishing schooner Croisine off Newfoundland while the latter was returning home to St. Malo with a full load of cod. The fishing boat passed down the liner's port side and its masts destroyed some of the liner's lifeboats on that side. Captain Ernest Davidson, who was also commodore of the convoy, ordered the convoy to continue while Otranto stopped to rescue the 37 survivors. The derelict Croisine was now a menace to navigation and Davidson ordered his gun crews to sink her later that evening. The liner caught back up with the convoy by daybreak. The following day, the first death from the influenza pandemic occurred and the soldier was buried at sea. Only one other flu death aboard Otranto is recorded, but others may have occurred before she met her end.

The convoy encountered a strong storm on 4 October that got even stronger over the next several days; by the morning of 6 October it was assessed as a Force 11 storm on the Beaufort scale with mountainous seas. The storm forced the British destroyers that were to rendezvous with them back into port on 5 October and the last American escort departed at 06:00. The weather prevented accurate navigation and the convoy was forced to proceed by dead reckoning. The ship's officers were uncertain if they were off the northern coast of Ireland or the western coast of Scotland. When dawn broke it revealed a rocky coastline 3 to 4 miles (4.8 to 6.4 km) to their east, just ahead of the convoy. Most of the ships correctly thought this was the Scottish coast and turned south, but Otranto's Officer of the Watch thought that it was the Irish coast and turned north. HMS Kashmir, another liner turned troopship, was only about a half-mile (0.80 km) to Otranto's north and the turns placed them on a collision course. Both ships attempted to avoid the collision, but their efforts cancelled out and Kashmir rammed Otranto on the port side amidships, a few miles off the rocky coast of Islay.

The impact punched a hole some 20 feet (6.1 m) deep and 16 feet (4.9 m) wide in Otranto, from below the waterline up to the boat deck. The hole was right at the bulkhead between the fore and aft stokeholds (boiler rooms) and both instantly flooded, killing most of the crewmen in those spaces. When the engine room flooded shortly afterwards, Otranto lost all electrical power and began to drift towards the cliffs of Islay. The water pressure caused other bulkheads to collapse, quickly flooding other spaces below the waterline and giving the ship a massive list to starboard. The impact also damaged many of the remaining lifeboats on that side. The crew attempted to use collision mats to cover the hole in the ship's side, but it proved to be too large. Kashmir's bow was crushed by the impact, although she was able to steam off when a wave forced the two ships apart soon after the collision.

The high winds and heavy seas prevented the launching of any lifeboats and Davidson had decided not to abandon ship just yet in the faint hope that some passengers and crewmen might be able to swim ashore once the ship got closer. About a half-hour after the collision, the destroyer HMS Mounsey appeared after searching for the convoy during the night. Despite Davidson's order to stand clear, Mounsey's captain, Lieutenant Francis Craven, positioned his ship on Otranto's lee side to allow the men aboard the liner to jump aboard. Several times the two ships struck and the destroyer's hull was holed, her bridge smashed, two of three boiler rooms flooded, and many hull frames were broken by the force of the impacts. Nonetheless, Craven kept his small ship close and was able to rescue 300 American troops, 266 officers and crewmen from Otranto, one YMCA morale officer and 30 French fishermen, although many more men had been washed from the decks or crushed between the two ships. Despite the weight of the rescued men and the damage sustained in the rescue, Mounsey was able to reach Belfast safely although she was too badly damaged to return to her own home port against the storm.

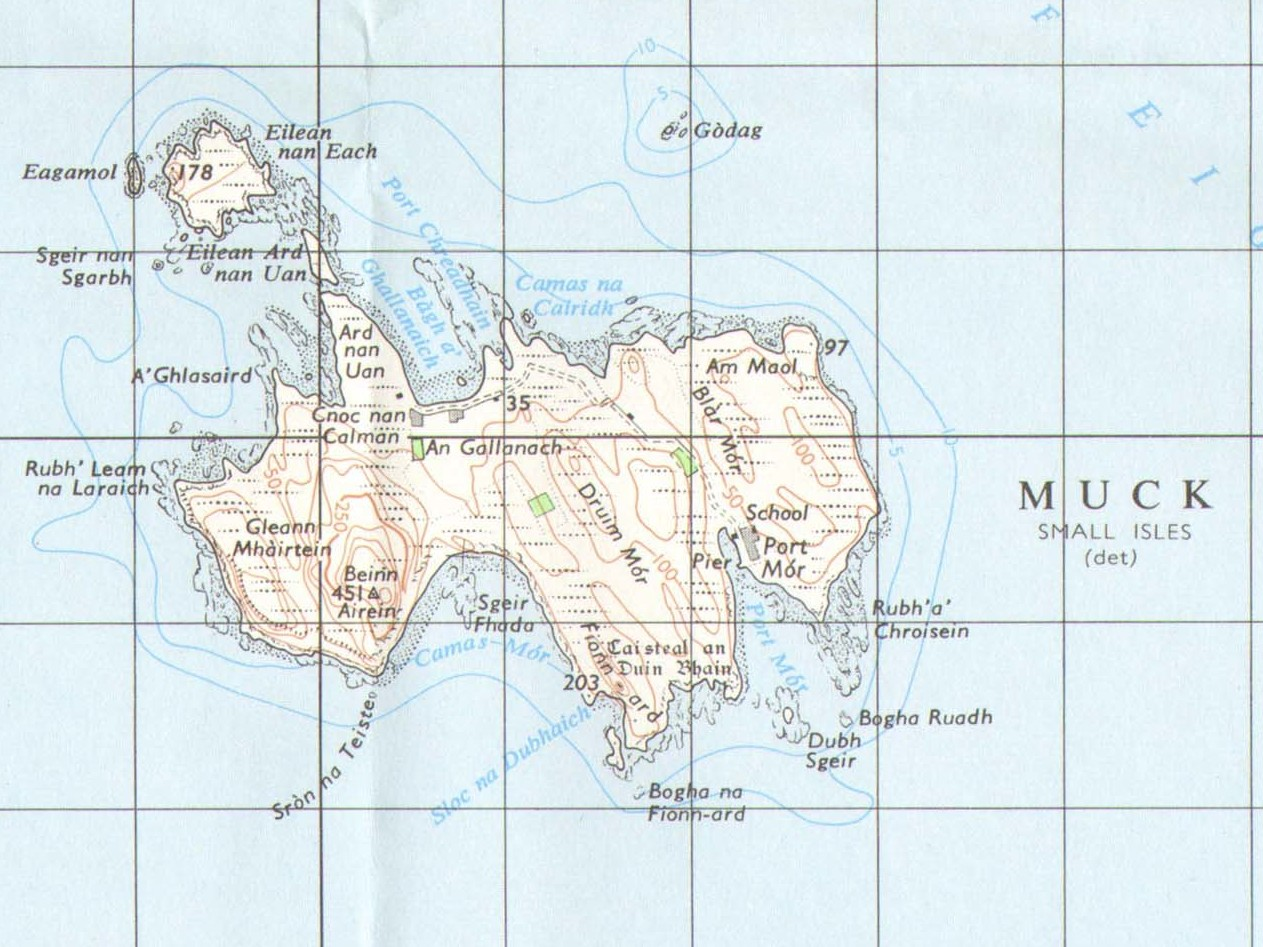
Muck, Scotland Map in 1957

About three hours after the collision, a large wave dropped Otranto onto "Old Women's Reef", about three-quarters of a mile (1.2 km) offshore, near the entrance to Machir Bay, missing a sandy beach just north of the reef. The action of the enormous waves quickly broke the ship in half and then ripped her bottom out. Of the roughly 489 men aboard after Mounsey departed, only 21 (17 of these were American) were able to successfully swim ashore, although two of these, including one American, later died of their injuries. The islanders were able to rescue some of these men by pulling them up the coastal cliffs or from rocks just offshore. By the following morning, the liner had been completely demolished by the heavy seas and the coastline was strewn with wreckage and hundreds of bodies in piles up to 15 feet (4.6 m) deep. A total of 316 Americans were found and buried on Islay and the nearby island of Muck.

The police sergeant at Bowmore, Malcolm McNeill, the maternal grandfather of a later (1999–2004) NATO general secretary, George Robertson, commended local people in his report: 'though they had so little, they gave so much to help' and also responded to enquiries from the American families of those lost from the Otranto (and in the 1918 SS Tuscania sinking).

==== Aftermath ====
Craven was awarded the Distinguished Service Order and the Navy Cross for gallantry displayed in Mounsey's rescue operation. The best estimate of the casualty toll from the disaster is a total of 470 men: 12 officers and 84 crewmen from Otranto, 1 officer and 357 American enlisted men, and 6 French fishermen. After the war, most of the American bodies were reinterred at Brookwood American Cemetery and Memorial in Surrey, England, or repatriated to the United States. Additionally, an 80-foot (24.4 m) stone tower was built on the Mull of Oa by the American Red Cross to commemorate the men lost aboard Otranto and Tuscania which was sunk by a German U-boat nearby. The remains of the wreck were later salvaged by Keith Jessop.

== Bibliography ==
- Corbett, Julian (March 1997). Naval Operations to the Battle of the Falklands. History of the Great War: Based on Official Documents. Vol. I (2nd, reprint of the 1938 ed.). London and Nashville, TN: Imperial War Museum and Battery Press. ISBN 0-89839-256-X.
- The Marconi Press Agency Ltd (1913). The Year Book of Wireless Telegraphy and Telephony. London: The St Katherine Press.
- Massie, Robert K (2003). Castles of Steel: Britain, Germany, and the Winning of the Great War at Sea. New York: Random House. ISBN 0-679-45671-6.
- Osborne, Richard; Spong, Harry & Grover, Tom (2007). Armed Merchant Cruisers 1878–1945. Windsor: World Warship Society. ISBN 978-0-9543310-8-5.
- Scott, R. Neil (2012). Many Were Held by the Sea: The Tragic Sinking of HMS Otranto. Lanham, Maryland: Rowman & Littlefield. ISBN 978-1-4422-1342-5.
- "Transcript: HMS OTRANTO – August 1914 to December 1916, UK out, South American Station, Battle of Coronel, South East Coast of America Squadron, Pacific (Part 1 of 2)". Royal Navy Log Books of the World War 1 Era. Naval-History.net.
- "Transcript: HMS OTRANTO – January 1917 to August 1918, Pacific coast of S & N America, UK home, N Atlantic convoys (Part 2 of 2)". Royal Navy Log Books of the World War 1 Era. Naval-History.net.
