= SM UB-124 =

1918 Type UB III German submarine

- UB-148 at sea, a U-boat similar to UB-124.

History

German Empire
- Name: UB-124
- Ordered: 6 / 8 February 1917
- Builder: AG Weser, Bremen
- Cost: 3,654,000 German Papiermark
- Yard number: 297
- Laid down: 10 July 1917
- Launched: 19 March 1918
- Commissioned: 22 April 1918
- Fate: Sunk 20 July 1918

General characteristics
- Class & type: Type UB III submarine
- Displacement: 512 t (504 long tons) surfaced; 643 t (633 long tons) submerged
- Length: 55.85 m (183 ft 3 in) (o/a)
- Beam: 5.80 m (19 ft)
- Draught: 3.72 m (12 ft 2 in)
- Propulsion: 2 × propeller shaft; 2 × Körting four-stroke 6-cylinder diesel engines, 1,050 bhp (780 kW); 2 × Siemens-Schuckert electric motors, 780 shp (580 kW)
- Speed: 13.9 knots (25.7 km/h; 16.0 mph) surfaced; 7.6 knots (14.1 km/h; 8.7 mph) submerged
- Range: 7,280 nmi (13,480 km; 8,380 mi) at 6 knots (11 km/h; 6.9 mph) surfaced; 55 nmi (102 km; 63 mi) at 4 knots (7.4 km/h; 4.6 mph) submerged
- Test depth: 50 m (160 ft)
- Complement: 3 officers, 31 men
- Armament: 5 × 50 cm (19.7 in) torpedo tubes (4 bow, 1 stern); 10 torpedoes; 1 × 8.8 cm (3.46 in) deck gun

Service record
- Part of: III Flotilla; 1 – 20 July 1918
- Commanders: Oblt.z.S. Hans Oscar Wutsdorff; 22 April – 20 July 1918
- Operations: 1 patrol
- Victories: 1 merchant ship sunk (32,234 GRT)

SM UB-124 was a German Type UB III submarine or U-boat in the German Imperial Navy (German: Kaiserliche Marine) during World War I. She was commissioned into the German Imperial Navy on 22 April 1918 as SM UB-124. (Note: "SM" stands for "Seiner Majestät" (English: His Majesty's) and combined with the U for Unterseeboot would be translated as His Majesty's Submarine.)

UB-124 was sunk on 20 July 1918 by HMS Marne, Milbrook, Pigeon, and more than 30 patrol craft at 55°43′N 7°51′W.

== Construction ==
She was built by AG Weser of Bremen and, following just under a year of construction, launched at Bremen on 19 March 1918. UB-124 was commissioned later the same year under the command of Oblt.z.S. Hans Oscar Wutsdorff. Like all Type UB III submarines, UB-124 carried ten torpedoes and was armed with an 8.8 cm (3.46 in) deck gun. UB-124 would carry a crew of up to three officers and 31 men and had a cruising range of 7,280 nautical miles (13,480 km; 8,380 mi). UB-124 had a displacement of 512 t (504 long tons) while surfaced and 643 t (633 long tons) when submerged. Her engines enabled her to travel at 13.9 knots (25.7 km/h; 16.0 mph) when surfaced and 7.6 knots (14.1 km/h; 8.7 mph) when submerged.

== Summary of raiding history ==
| Date | Name | Nationality | Tonnage (Note: Tonnages are in gross register tons) | Fate |
|---|---|---|---|---|
| 20 July 1918 | Justicia | United Kingdom | 32,234 | Sunk |

== Bibliography ==
- Bendert, Harald (2000). Die UB-Boote der Kaiserlichen Marine, 1914-1918. Einsätze, Erfolge, Schicksal (in German). Hamburg: Verlag E.S. Mittler & Sohn GmbH. ISBN 3-8132-0713-7.
- Gröner, Erich; Jung, Dieter; Maass, Martin (1991). U-boats and Mine Warfare Vessels. German Warships 1815–1945. Vol. 2. Translated by Thomas, Keith; Magowan, Rachel. London: Conway Maritime Press. ISBN 0-85177-593-4.
- Rössler, Eberhard (1979). Die deutschen U-Boote und ihre Werften: eine Bilddokumentation über den deutschen U-Bootbau; in zwei Bänden (in German). Vol. I. Munich: Bernard & Graefe. ISBN 3-7637-5213-7.
