= HMS Opal (1915) =

Admiralty M-class destroyer

Coordinates: 58°46.2258′N 2°55.896′W

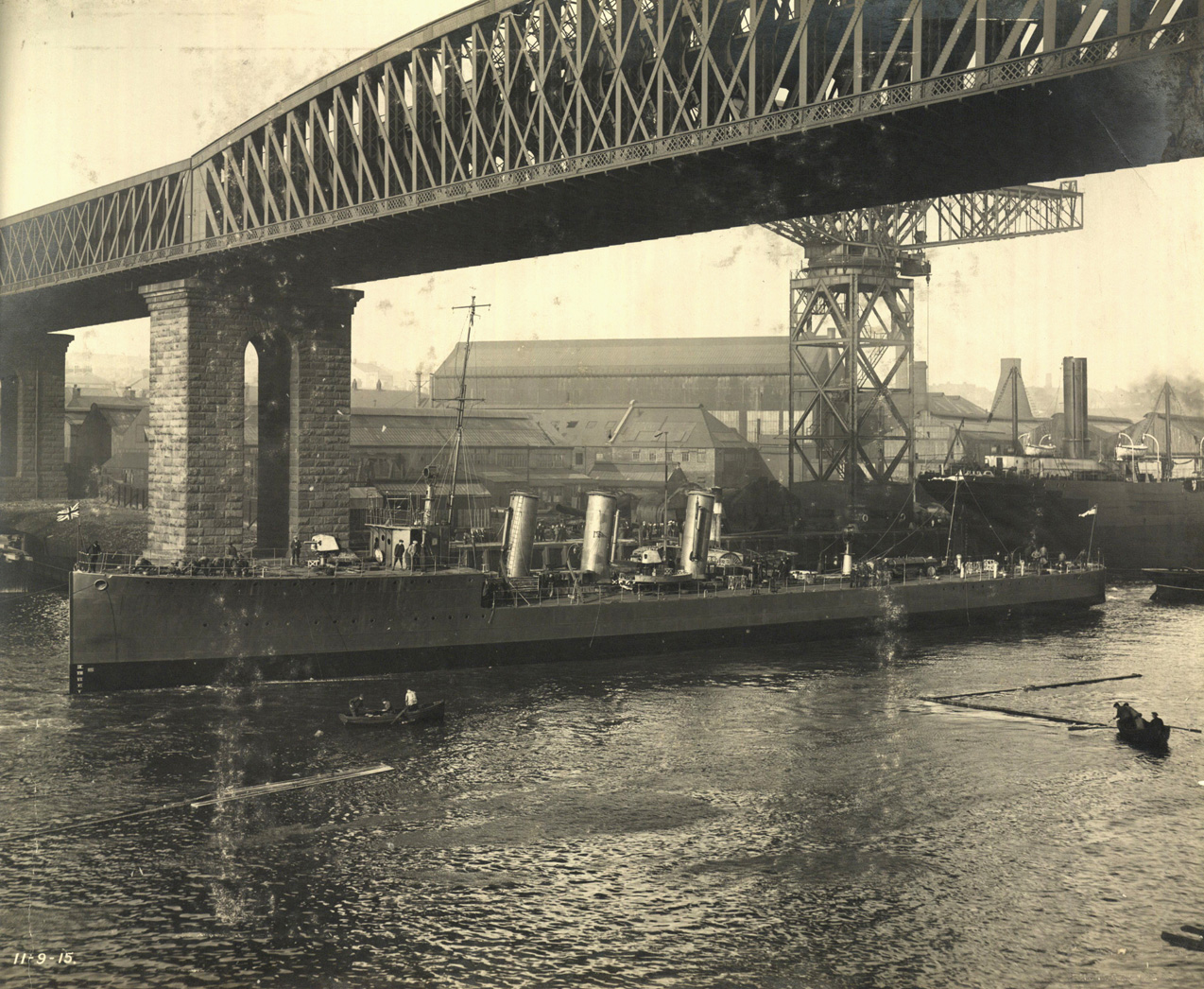
- Opal on the River Wear

History

United Kingdom
- Name: Opal
- Namesake: Opal
- Ordered: November 1914
- Builder: William Doxford & Sons, Sunderland
- Laid down: 1 February 1915
- Launched: 11 September 1915
- Completed: April 1916
- Fate: Wrecked, 12 January 1918

General characteristics
- Class & type: Admiralty M-class destroyer
- Displacement: 971 long tons (987 t) (normal)
- Length: 273 ft 4 in (83.3 m)
- Beam: 26 ft 8 in (8.13 m)
- Draught: 9 ft 8 in (2.95 m) (deep)
- Installed power: 25,000 shp (18,642 kW)
- Propulsion: 3 shafts, 3 steam turbines
- Speed: 34 knots (63 km/h; 39 mph)
- Range: 2,100 nmi (3,900 km; 2,400 mi) at 15 knots (28 km/h; 17 mph)
- Complement: 76
- Armament: 3 × single 4 in (102 mm) guns; 3 × single 2 pdr (40 mm (1.6 in)) AA guns; 2 × twin 21 in (533 mm) torpedo tubes

HMS Opal was an Admiralty M-class destroyer built for the Royal Navy (RN) in 1915–1916 during the First World War. Assigned to the 12th Destroyer Flotilla of the Grand Fleet at Scapa Flow, Opal participated in the Battle of Jutland and the Action of 19 August 1916. The ship ran aground and was wrecked in early 1918 whilst on patrol off the Orkney Islands with only a single crewman surviving. Her wreck was sold for scrap in the 1930s.

== Background and description ==
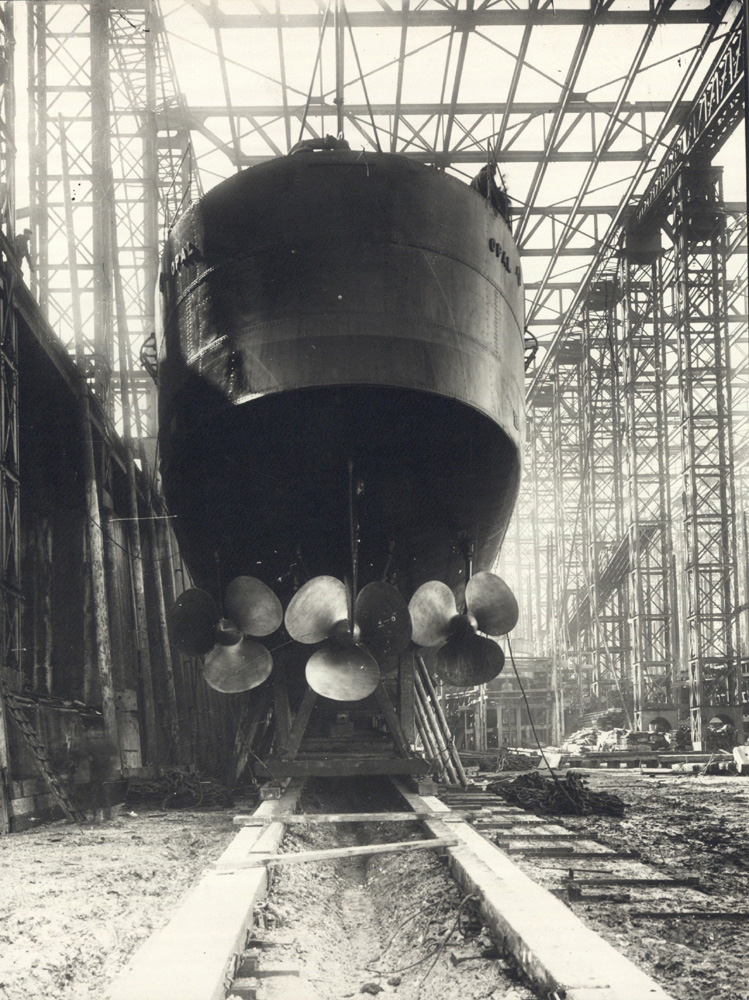
Stern view of Opal, ready for launch

The Admiralty M class were improved and faster versions of the preceding Laforey-class destroyer. Opal was one of the third batch of 25 destroyers (consisting of 22 M-class destroyers and three Parker-class flotilla leaders) ordered in late November 1914 as part of the Third War Programme. They displaced 971 long tons (987 t) at normal load. The ships had an overall length of 273 feet 4 inches (83.3 m), a beam of 26 feet 8 inches (8.1 m) and a draught of 9 feet 8 inches (2.9 m). Opal was powered by a Parsons direct-drive steam turbine set, driving three propeller shafts using steam provided by three Yarrow boilers. The turbines developed a total of 25,000 shaft horsepower (19,000 kW) and gave a maximum speed of 34 knots (63 km/h; 39 mph). Opal reached a speed of 34.3 knots (63.5 km/h; 39.5 mph) during her sea trials early in 1916. The ships carried enough fuel oil to give them a range of 2,100 nautical miles (3,900 km; 2,400 mi) at 15 knots (28 km/h; 17 mph). Their complement consisted of 76 officers and ratings.

The ships were armed with three single QF 4-inch (102 mm) Mark IV guns and two QF 1.5-pounder (37 mm) anti-aircraft guns. These latter guns were later replaced by a pair of QF 2-pounder (40 mm) "pom-pom" AA guns. The ships were also fitted with two rotating twin mounts for 21-inch (533 mm) torpedoes aft of the funnels.

== Construction and career ==
Opal was the second ship of her name to serve in the RN. She was laid down at William Doxford & Sons' shipyard in Sunderland on 1 February 1915, and was launched on 11 September 1915. The ship was completed in April 1916 and was assigned to the 12th Destroyer Flotilla, based at Scapa Flow as part of the Grand Fleet. Opal took part in the Battle of Jutland where the Twelfth Flotilla supported the Grand Fleet. The ship attempted to attack German battleships during the night of 31 May/1 June, but was thwarted when she lost touch with her flotilla leader. Opal participated in the indecisive Action of 19 August 1916 The loss of a pair of light cruisers to submarines led Admiral John Jellicoe, commander of the Grand Fleet, to decide to not risk the major units of the fleet south of 55° 30' North due to the prevalence of German submarines and mines. The Admiralty concurred and stipulated that the Grand Fleet would not sortie unless the German fleet was attempting an invasion of Britain or that it could be forced into an engagement at a disadvantage.

Although still attached to the Grand Fleet and based at Scapa Flow, the destroyers were often unavailable to the fleet due to work in anti-submarine patrols. For example, between 14 and 24 June, the flotilla was deployed as part of a substantial operation that undertook a wide-reaching search for German submarines around the coast of Scotland. Despite the force employing approximately 56% of the destroyers available to the Grand Fleet, Opal was not alone in not seeing a single enemy vessel throughout the operation, and no German submarines were sunk. Increasingly, patrols did not provide the security needed to shipping and the Admiralty redeployed the destroyers to act as escorts for convoys, which proved more effective.

On 24 July 1917, Opal and the destroyer Mounsey were escorting an east-bound convoy on the Scandinavian (Lerwick–Norway) route, when the convoy came under attack by the German submarine U-67, which fired two torpedoes from distance at the convoy, one of which hit and sank the Swedish merchant ship Viking. In response, Opal followed back the track of the torpedo and dropped a depth charge on the estimated location of the submarine, but U-67 escaped unharmed.

On 12 January 1918, Opal joined her sister ship, Narborough, and the light cruiser Boadicea in a night patrol to hunt German auxiliary warships suspected to be laying mines off the Scottish coast. By 17:30, the weather had deteriorated to such an extreme degree that the destroyers were in danger of swamping and foundering and visibility was near zero. Fearing that her companions might sink, Boadicea ordered Opal and Narborough back to Scapa Flow while she continued alone. For the next four hours, Opal regularly sent reports indicating her course and intention to return, but at 21:27, a garbled message stating have run aground was received, followed by silence. The weather was so atrocious that no vessels could be despatched until the following morning, and it was two days before Opal was found, battered, broken and empty on the Clett of Crura off the east coast of South Ronaldsay. Narborough was found in a similar position nearby. One survivor — William Sissons — was later located on a small islet, and he related that the ships had been sailing a regular slow course making frequent soundings and radio reports, but had suddenly crashed headlong into the rocks, probably due to a navigation error by Opal's captain. Both wrecks were abandoned and broken up by the sea over the next few weeks taking the bodies of both crews, bar the single survivor, with them. The wrecks were sold for scrap during the 1930s.

== Pennant numbers ==
Pennant number	From	To
G02	April 1916	January 1917
G42	January 1917	January 1918
G41	January 1918	Loss
