= HMS Narborough (1916) =

Admiralty M-class destroyer

History

United Kingdom
- Name: Narborough
- Namesake: Rear-Admiral Sir John Narborough
- Ordered: February 1915
- Builder: John Brown & Company, Clydebank
- Laid down: May 1915
- Launched: 2 March 1916
- Completed: April 1916
- Identification: G.39 (September 1915); F.11 (January 1917); F.02 (January 1918)
- Fate: Wrecked, 12 January 1918

General characteristics (as built)
- Class & type: Admiralty M-class destroyer
- Displacement: 971 long tons (987 t)
- Length: 273 ft 4 in (83.31 m) (o/a)
- Beam: 26 ft 8 in (8.13 m)
- Draught: 9 ft 8 in (2.95 m)
- Installed power: 4 × Yarrow boilers; 25,000 shp (19,000 kW)
- Propulsion: 3 shafts; 3 steam turbines
- Speed: 34 knots (63 km/h; 39 mph)
- Range: 2,100 nmi (3,900 km; 2,400 mi) at 15 knots (28 km/h; 17 mph)
- Complement: 76
- Armament: 3 × QF 4 in (102 mm) guns; 2 × QF 1.5-pdr (37 mm) AA guns; 2 × twin 21 in (533 mm) torpedo tubes

HMS Narborough was an Admiralty M-class destroyer built for the Royal Navy during the First World War. Completed in 1916, the ship played a minor role in the Battle of Jutland later that year and the Second Battle of Heligoland Bight in 1917. She was wrecked after running aground in 1918.

== Description ==
The Admiralty M class were improved and faster versions of the preceding Laforey-class destroyer. Narborough was one of the fourth batch of 20 destroyers (consisting of 18 M-class destroyers and a pair of Parker-class flotilla leaders) ordered in February 1915 as part of the Fourth War Programme.They displaced 971 long tons (987 t). The ships had an overall length of 273 feet 4 inches (83.3 m), a beam of 26 feet 8 inches (8.1 m) and a draught of 9 feet 8 inches (2.9 m). Narborough was powered by a Brown-Curtis direct-drive steam turbine set, driving three propeller shafts using steam provided by three Yarrow boilers. The turbine developed a total of 25,000 shaft horsepower (19,000 kW) and gave a maximum speed of 34 knots (63 km/h; 39 mph). The ships carried enough fuel oil to give them a range of 2,100 nautical miles (3,900 km; 2,400 mi) at 15 knots (28 km/h; 17 mph). The ships' complement was 76 officers and ratings.

The ships were armed with three single QF 4-inch (102 mm) Mark IV guns and two QF 1.5-pounder (37 mm) anti-aircraft guns. These latter guns were later replaced by a pair of QF 2-pounder (40 mm) "pom-pom" AA guns. The ships were also fitted with two rotating twin mounts for 21-inch (533 mm) torpedoes.

== Construction and service ==
Named after Rear-Admiral Sir John Narborough, Narborough was the first ship of her name to serve in the RN. She was ordered under the Fourth War Programme in February 1915 and built by John Brown & Company at Clydeside. The ship was laid down in May 1915, launched on 2 March 1916 and completed in April. On commissioning, Narborough joined the 13th Destroyer Flotilla, part of the Battlecruiser Force of the Grand Fleet. Narborough was one of ten destroyers of the 13th Flotilla that took part in the Battle of Jutland on 31 May–1 June 1916, supporting Admiral Beatty's battlecruisers. At 16:09, the 13th Flotilla was ordered to launch a torpedo attack against German battlecruisers, while at almost the same time, the German 9th Torpedo-boat Flotilla was ordered to attack the British battlecruisers. The two destroyer forces became involved in an intense engagement in which the British destroyer Nomad was disabled and the German torpedo boats V27 and V29 were sunk. Narborough did not open fire during this clash. The ship participated in the indecisive Action of 19 August 1916 The loss of a pair of light cruisers to submarines led Admiral John Jellicoe, commander of the Grand Fleet, to decide to not risk the major units of the fleet south of 55° 30' North due to the prevalence of German submarines and mines. The Admiralty concurred and stipulated that the Grand Fleet would not sortie unless the German fleet was attempting an invasion of Britain or that it could be forced into an engagement at a disadvantage.

Although still attached to the Grand Fleet and based at Scapa Flow, the destroyers were often unavailable to the fleet due to work in anti-submarine patrols. For example, between 14 and 24 June, Narborough and two other destroyers from the flotilla were deployed as part of a substantial operation that undertook a wide-reaching search for German submarines around the coast of Scotland. Despite the force employing approximately 56% of the destroyers available to the Grand Fleet, Narborough was not alone in not seeing a single enemy vessel throughout the operation, and no German submarines were sunk. Increasingly, patrols did not provide the security needed to shipping and the Admiralty redeployed the destroyers to act as escorts for convoys, which proved more effective.

Narborough continued as part of the 13th Destroyer Flotilla until transferring to the 12th Destroyer Flotilla of the Grand Fleet in November 1917. She was at sea screening the 1st Battle Squadron during the Second Battle of Heligoland Bight on 13 November 1917, but did not see action as the battleships were in reserve during the battle.

On 12 January 1918, Narborough joined her sister ship, Opal, and the light cruiser Boadicea in a night patrol to hunt German auxiliary warships suspected to be laying mines off the Scottish coast. By 17:30, the weather had deteriorated to such an extreme degree that the destroyers were in danger of swamping and foundering and visibility was near zero. Fearing that her companions might sink, Boadicea ordered Opal and Narborough back to Scapa Flow while she continued alone. At 21:27, a garbled message stating have run aground was received from Opal, followed by silence. The weather was so atrocious that no vessels could be despatched until the following morning, and it was two days before sisters were found, battered, broken and empty on the Clett of Crura off the east coast of South Ronaldsay. Narborough was found in a similar position nearby. One survivor — William Sissons from Opal — was later located on a small islet, and he related that the ships had been sailing a regular slow course making frequent soundings and radio reports, but had suddenly crashed headlong into the rocks, probably due to a navigation error by Opal's captain. Both wrecks were abandoned and broken up by the sea over the next few weeks taking the bodies of both crews, bar the single survivor, with them. The wrecks were sold for scrap during the 1930s.

== Bibliography ==
- Campbell, John (1998). Jutland: An Analysis of the Fighting. Conway Maritime Press. ISBN 0-85177-750-3.
- Colledge, J. J.; Warlow, Ben & Bush, Steve (2020). Ships of the Royal Navy: The Complete Record of all Fighting Ships of the Royal Navy from the 15th Century to the Present (5th revised and updated ed.). Seaforth Publishing. ISBN 978-1-5267-9327-0.
- Dittmar, F. J. & Colledge, J. J. (1972). British Warships 1914–1919. Ian Allan. ISBN 0-7110-0380-7.
- Friedman, Norman (2009). British Destroyers From Earliest Days to the Second World War. Naval Institute Press. ISBN 978-1-59114-081-8.
- Halpern, Paul G. (1995). A Naval History of World War I. Naval Institute Press. ISBN 1-55750-352-4.
- Manning, T. D. & Walker, C. F. (1959). British Warship Names. Putnam. OCLC 838607.
- March, Edgar J. (1966). British Destroyers: A History of Development, 1892–1953; Drawn by Admiralty Permission From Official Records & Returns, Ships' Covers & Building Plans. Seeley Service. OCLC 164893555.
- McBride, K. D. (1999). "Opal and Narborough". Mariner's Mirror. 85 (2): 212–215. doi:10.1080/00253359.1999.10656742.
- Monograph No. 33: Home Waters – Part VII: From June 1916 to November 1916. Naval Staff Monographs (Historical). Vol. XVII. The Naval Staff, Training and Staff Duties Division. October 1927.
- Monograph No. 34: Home Waters—Part VIII: December 1916 to April 1917 (PDF). Naval Staff Monographs (Historical). Vol. XVIII. The Naval Staff, Training and Staff Duties Division. 1933.
- Monograph No. 35: Home Waters—Part IX: 1st May 1917 to 31st July 1917 (PDF). Naval Staff Monographs (Historical). Vol. XIX. The Naval Staff, Training and Staff Duties Division. 1939.
- Newbolt, Henry (1996) [1928]. Naval Operations. History of the Great War Based on Official Documents. Vol. IV. Imperial War Museum in association with the Battery Press. ISBN 0-89839-253-5.
- Newbolt, Henry (1996) [1931]. Naval Operations. History of the Great War Based on Official Documents. Vol. V. Imperial War Museum in association with the Battery Press. ISBN 0-89839-255-1.
- Preston, Antony (1985). "Great Britain and Empire Forces". In Gray, Randal (ed.). Conway's All the World's Fighting Ships 1906–1921. Naval Institute Press. pp. 1–104. ISBN 0-85177-245-5.
