= SS Tuscania (1914) =

British ocean liner (1914–1918)

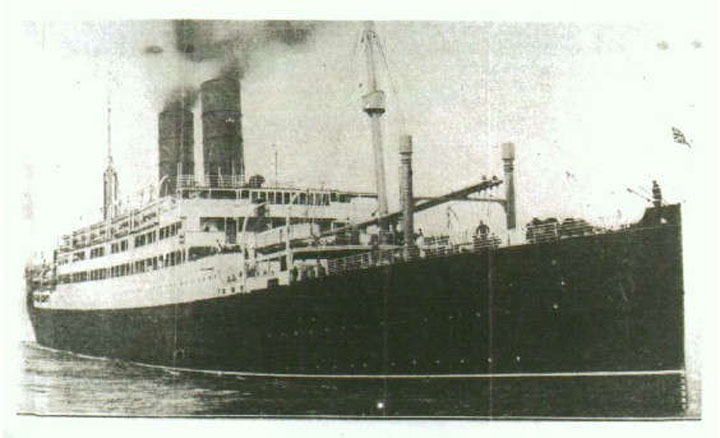
- Tuscania

History

United Kingdom
- Name: Tuscania
- Namesake: Tuscany
- Owner: Anchor Line
- Builder: Alexander Stephen and Sons, Linthouse
- Launched: 4 September 1914
- Fate: Sunk, 5 February 1918

General characteristics
- Type: Ocean liner
- Tonnage: 14,348 GRT
- Length: 567 ft (173 m)
- Beam: 66 ft 4 in (20.22 m)
- Depth: 45 ft (14 m)
- Installed power: 6 × Scotch boilers
- Propulsion: Parsons steam turbines - twin screw
- Capacity: 2,500+ passengers
- Armament: 4-inch naval gun (fitted October 1916)
- Notes: Transylvania and Tuscania were the first installations of geared turbines in large trans-Atlantic vessels.

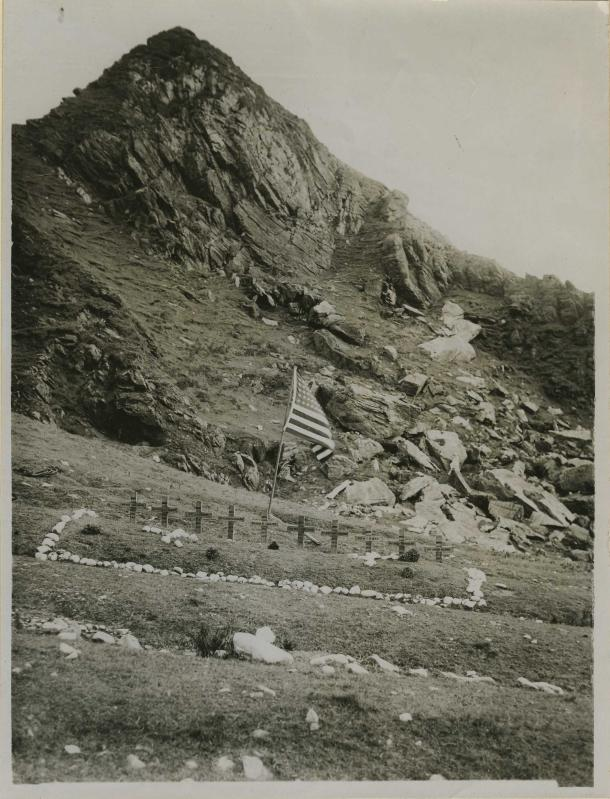
Graveyard from the Tuscania disaster

SS Tuscania was a luxury liner of the Anchor Line, a subsidiary of the Cunard Line and named after Tuscania, Italy. In 1918 the ship was torpedoed and sunk by the German U-boat UB-77 while transporting American troops to Europe with the loss of 210 lives.

== Operations ==
Tuscania carried passengers between New York City and Glasgow while in service with the Anchor Line, on a route that had previously been assigned to her sister ship Transylvania. On her first trip to Glasgow, Tuscania was captained by David Bone, who was also a popular novelist of maritime adventures based on his life experiences. She continued to run this route even as World War I broke out in Europe in August 1914 and Germany initiated a submarine campaign against merchant shipping in waters near the United Kingdom.

Tuscania made international headlines for rescuing passengers and crew from the burning Greek steamer Athinai on 20 September 1915. In 1916, Tuscania was refitted and pressed into service as a troopship. She made the news again in March 1917 by evading a submarine and a suspected Imperial German Navy armed merchant cruiser.

== Final voyage and sinking ==
On 24 January 1918, Tuscania departed Hoboken, New Jersey, with 384 crew members and 2,013 United States Army personnel aboard. On the morning of 5 February 1918, she turned south for the North Channel en route Liverpool. The German submarine UB-77 sighted Tuscania's convoy during the day, and stalked it until early evening. Under the cover of darkness around 6:40 pm, the submarine's commanding officer, Korvettenkapitän Wilhelm Meyer, ordered two torpedoes fired at Tuscania. The second of these struck home, sending her to the bottom of the Irish Sea within about four hours. Tuscania sank nearly three years to the day after her maiden voyage as a passenger liner. About 210 of the troops and crew were lost, while many others were rescued by the Royal Navy destroyers Mosquito and Pigeon. Some of the U.S. Troops were rescued by an Irish fishing boat as well.

The wreck of Tuscania lies between Scotland's Islay and Northern Ireland's Rathlin Island, about 7 nautical miles (13 km; 8.1 mi) north of Rathlin lighthouse, at roughly 55°22′N 6°13′W at a depth of 100 metres (330 ft).

Many of the bodies of the drowned servicemen washed up on the shores of Islay and were buried there. The police sergeant at Bowmore, Malcolm McNeill, the maternal grandfather of NATO general secretary (1999 - 2004) George Robertson, had said of local people in his official report: 'though they had so little, they gave so much to help those who were wrecked on their shores' and he wrote back to all those raising enquiries from America on family members lost on Tuscania (and in the 1918 HMS Otranto sinking).

The loss of Tuscania prompted the government of Washburn County, Wisconsin to burn its German textbooks as part of anti-German sentiment.

After the First World War, many were reinterred in Brookwood Military Cemetery or repatriated to the United States. Just one grave is left on the island today. In 1919, the American government and American Red Cross unveiled a tower as a permanent memorial, for those lost on Tuscania and Otranto, on the southern-most tip of Islay, the Mull of Oa.

== Notable passengers ==
- Harry R. Truman, (survived sinking but later died in the 1980 eruption of Mount St. Helens).
- Sydney Brooks, British critic (survived sinking)
- Leonard Read, founder of Foundation for Economic Education (survived sinking)
- Matthew B. Juan, First Arizonian to die In World War I (survived sinking)

== Army units on board ==
- 100th Aero Squadron
- 158th Aero Squadron
- 213th Aero Squadron
- 32nd Infantry Division (United States)
- 20th Engineer Regiment
- 357th Infantry Regiment
- 165th Depot
