= HMS Mons (1915) =

British M-Class destroyer

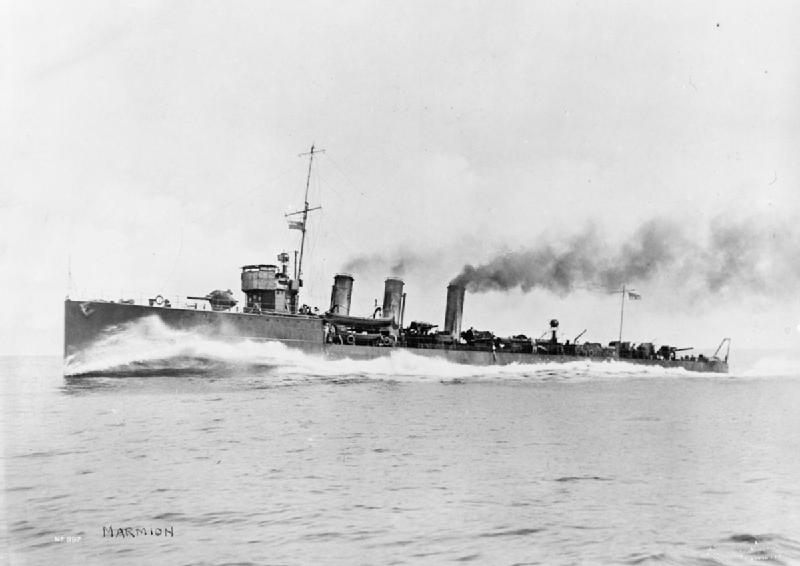
- Sister ship HMS Marmion

History

United Kingdom
- Name: HMS Mons
- Namesake: Battle of Mons
- Ordered: September 1914
- Builder: John Brown & Company, Clydebank
- Yard number: 433
- Laid down: 30 September 1914
- Launched: 1 May 1915
- Completed: 14 July 1915
- Out of service: 8 November 1921
- Fate: Sold to be broken up

General characteristics
- Class & type: Admiralty M-class destroyer
- Displacement: 860 long tons (870 t) (normal); 1,021 long tons (1,037 t) full load
- Length: 273 ft 8 in (83.4 m) (o.a.)
- Beam: 26 ft 9 in (8.2 m)
- Draught: 16 ft 3 in (5.0 m)
- Installed power: 3 Yarrow boilers, 25,000 shp (19,000 kW)
- Propulsion: Brown-Curtis steam turbines, 3 shafts
- Speed: 34 knots (63.0 km/h; 39.1 mph)
- Range: 2,280 nmi (4,220 km; 2,620 mi) at 17 kn (31 km/h; 20 mph)
- Complement: 80
- Armament: 3 × single QF 4-inch (102 mm) Mark IV guns; 1 × single 2-pdr 40 mm (1.6 in) AA gun; 2 × twin 21 in (533 mm) torpedo tubes

HMS Mons was an Admiralty M-class destroyer which served with the Royal Navy during the First World War and fought in the Battle of Jutland. The M class was an improvement on the preceding L class, capable of higher speeds. The ship, the first British naval vessel to be named after the Battle of Mons, was launched in 1915. Joining the Grand Fleet as part of the new Eleventh Destroyer Flotilla, the destroyer was soon in action, taking part in patrols that aimed to draw out the German High Seas Fleet. During the Battle of Jutland in 1916, Mons attacked the German light cruisers at the forefront of the German battleline but scored no hits. After the armistice, the destroyer was placed in reserve. Mons was found to be worn out by wartime operations and, despite only serving for six years, in 1921, was sold to be broken up.

== Design and development ==
Mons was one of the initial six Admiralty M-class destroyers ordered by the British Admiralty in September 1914 as part of the First Emergency War Programme. The M class was an improved version of the earlier L class destroyers, designed to reach a higher speed in order to counter rumoured German fast destroyers, although it transpired these vessels did not exist. Although envisioned to have a maximum speed of 36 knots (67 km/h; 41 mph), they were eventually designed for a speed 2 knots (3.7 km/h; 2.3 mph) slower.

The destroyer had a length of 273 feet 8 inches (83.4 m) overall, with a beam of 26 feet 9 inches (8.2 m) and a draught of 16 feet 3 inches (5.0 m). Displacement was 860 long tons (870 t) normal and 1,021 long tons (1,037 t) full load. Power was provided by three Yarrow boilers feeding Brown-Curtis steam turbines rated at 25,000 shaft horsepower (19,000 kW) and driving three shafts, to give a design speed of 34 knots (63 km/h; 39 mph). Three funnels were fitted. A total of 268 long tons (272 t) of oil could be carried, including 40 long tons (41 t) in peace tanks that were not used in wartime, giving a range of 2,280 nautical miles (4,220 km; 2,620 mi) at 17 knots (31 km/h; 20 mph).

Armament consisted of three single QF 4-inch (102 mm) Mk IV guns on the ship's centreline, with one on the forecastle, one aft on a raised platform and one between the middle and aft funnels. Torpedo armament consisted of two twin mounts for 21 in (533 mm) torpedoes. A single QF 2-pounder 40 mm (1.6 in) "pom-pom" anti-aircraft gun was mounted between the torpedo tubes. After February 1916, for anti-submarine warfare, Mons was equipped with two chutes for two depth charges. The number of depth charges carried increased as the war progressed. The ship had a complement of 80 officers and ratings.

== Construction and career ==
Mons was laid down by John Brown & Company of Clydebank on 30 September 1914 alongside sister ship Marne with the yard number 433, launched on 1 May the following year and completed on 14 July. The first vessel in the navy to be named after the Battle of Mons, the ship was deployed as part of the Grand Fleet based at Scapa Flow, joining the newly formed Eleventh Destroyer Flotilla.

The destroyer took part in a large naval exercise, involving four flotillas of the Grand Fleet, on 26 and 27 February 1916. The exercise had been originally planned as joint with the Harwich Force but unfavourable weather prevented those destroyers sailing north and so activity instead focused on manoeuvres to coordinate the destroyers with battleships and battlecruisers. The vessel subsequently took part in a number of sorties, looking for the German High Seas Fleet, including a large operation on 21 April which involved battleships from the First, Second and Third Battle Squadrons. None of these led to a confrontation with the German fleet until the Battle of Jutland.

On 30 May, the destroyer sailed with the Grand Fleet to participate in the Battle of Jutland, the only major engagement between the Royal Navy and the German High Seas Fleet during the war. Mons served as one of four members of the Eleventh Destroyer Flotilla attached to the First and Fourth Battle Squadrons. As the German fleet approached during the night on 31 May, the destroyers were spotted by the light cruisers of the High Seas Fleet. Mons attacked the German warships with gunfire but recorded no hits. The flotilla was recalled before the rest of the German fleet was seen. The destroyer did not have the opportunity to attack the enemy for the rest of the battle and returned to port without damage.

While patrolling to the west of the Shetland Islands on 23 June 1917, Mons spotted the conning tower of a submarine and attacked, but not before the vessel dived. The attack was unsuccessful, although a single depth charge was expended as the submarine fled. The destroyer remained with the Eleventh Flotilla into the following year.

After the armistice of 11 November 1918, the Royal Navy returned to a peacetime level of mobilisation and Mons was declared superfluous to operational requirements. The harsh conditions of wartime service, particularly the combination of high speed and the poor weather that is typical of the North Sea, exacerbated by the fact that the hull was not galvanised, meant that much of the hull and superstructure was well worn. On 22 October 1919, the destroyer was given a reduced complement and placed in reserve at Devonport. However, this situation did not last long and, after being decommissioned, on 8 November 1921, Mons was sold to Slough TC to be broken up.

== Pennant numbers ==
Pennant number	Date
H2A	August 1915
G11	January 1917
G10	January 1918
G1A	March 1918
H89	June 1918
G03	January 1919
