= HMS Marne (1915) =

British M-Class destroyer, WW1

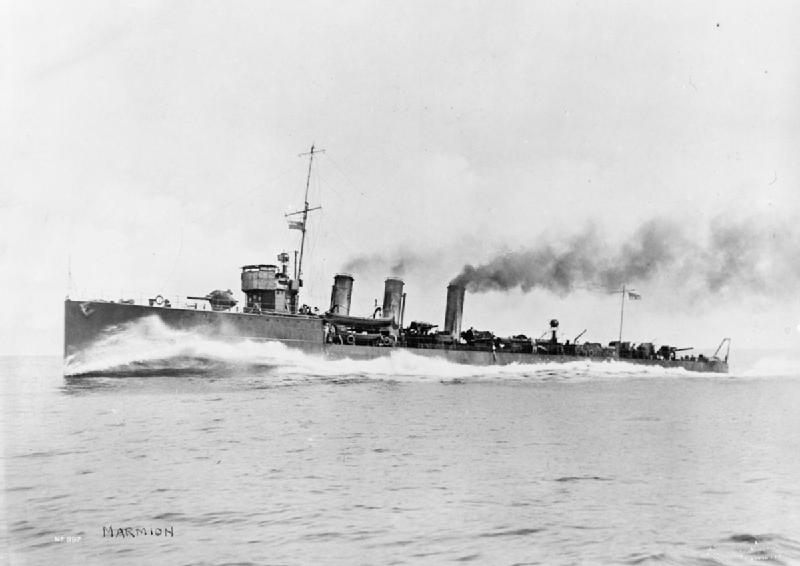
- Sister ship HMS Marmion

History

United Kingdom
- Name: HMS Marne
- Namesake: First Battle of the Marne
- Ordered: September 1914
- Builder: John Brown & Company, Clydebank
- Yard number: 434
- Laid down: 30 September 1914
- Launched: 29 May 1915
- Completed: 27 September 1915
- Out of service: 31 November 1921
- Fate: Sold to be broken up

General characteristics
- Class & type: Admiralty M-class destroyer
- Displacement: 860 long tons (870 t) (normal); 1,021 long tons (1,037 t) full load
- Length: 273 ft 8 in (83.4 m) (o.a.)
- Beam: 26 ft 9 in (8.2 m)
- Draught: 16 ft 3 in (5.0 m)
- Installed power: 3 Yarrow boilers, 25,000 shp (19,000 kW)
- Propulsion: Brown-Curtis steam turbines, 3 shafts
- Speed: 34 knots (63 km/h; 39 mph)
- Range: 2,280 nmi (4,220 km; 2,620 mi) at 17 kn (31 km/h; 20 mph)
- Complement: 80
- Armament: 3 × single QF 4-inch (102 mm) Mark IV guns; 1 × single 2-pdr 40 mm (1.6 in) AA gun; 2 × twin 21 in (533 mm) torpedo tubes

HMS Marne was an Admiralty M-class destroyer which served with the Royal Navy during the First World War. The M class was an improvement on the preceding L class, capable of higher speed. The ship, the first Royal Navy vessel to be named after the River Marne, was launched in 1915. For much of the war, the destroyer escorted merchant ships in convoys and Royal Navy warships, but was also involved in the rescue of crew from the battleship HMS King Edward VII in 1916. The destroyer also took part in the Battle of Jutland as part of the shield for the British battleships and engaged with the German light cruiser force with torpedoes, although all missed. In 1918, the destroyer, along with sister ships Milbrook and Pigeon, sank the German submarine UB-124. After the armistice, Marne was placed in reserve before being decommissioned and, in 1921, sold to be broken up.

== Design and development ==
Marne was one of the initial six Admiralty M-class destroyers ordered by the British Admiralty in September 1914 as part of the First Emergency War Programme. The M class was an improved version of the earlier L-class destroyers, required to reach a higher speed to counter rumoured German fast destroyers. The remit was to have a maximum speed of 36 knots (67 km/h; 41 mph) and, although the eventual design did not achieve this, the greater performance was appreciated by the navy. It transpired that the German ships did not exist.

The destroyer had a length of 273 feet 8 inches (83.4 m) overall, with a beam of 26 feet 9 inches (8.2 m) and a draught of 16 feet 3 inches (5.0 m). Displacement was 860 long tons (870 t) normal and 1,021 long tons (1,037 t) full load. Power was provided by three Yarrow boilers feeding Brown-Curtis steam turbines rated at 25,000 shaft horsepower (19,000 kW) and driving three shafts, to give a design speed of 34 knots (63 km/h; 39 mph). Three funnels were fitted. A total of 268 long tons (272 t) of oil could be carried, including 40 long tons (41 t) in peace tanks that were not used in wartime, giving a range of 2,280 nautical miles (4,220 km; 2,620 mi) at 17 knots (31 km/h; 20 mph).

Armament consisted of three single QF 4-inch (102 mm) Mk IV guns on the ship's centreline, with one on the forecastle, one aft on a raised platform and one between the middle and aft funnels. Torpedo armament consisted of two twin mounts for 21-inch (533 mm) torpedoes located aft of the funnels. A single QF 2-pounder 40 mm (1.6-inch) "pom-pom" anti-aircraft gun was mounted between the torpedo tubes. After February 1916, for anti-submarine warfare, Marne was equipped with two chutes, with initially one depth charge each. The number of depth charges carried increased as the war progressed. The ship had a complement of 80 officers and ratings.

== Construction and career ==
Marne was laid down by John Brown & Company of Clydebank on 30 September 1914 alongside sister ship Mons with the yard number 434, launched on 29 May the following year and completed on 27 September. The destroyer was the first vessel in the navy to be named after the river Marne in France. The ship was deployed as part of the Grand Fleet, joining the newly formed Eleventh Destroyer Flotilla.

After the battleship King Edward VII had struck a mine on 10 January 1916 off the northern Scottish coast, Marne was one of twelve destroyers that came to the stricken ship's aid. The destroyer, along with Fortune, Musketeer and Nessus, transferred all but one of the crew and took them back to port. On 24 April, the destroyer, as part of the Eleventh Destroyer Flotilla, was based at Cromarty. The flotilla formed part of the support for the Grand Fleet in their response to the German bombardment of Yarmouth and Lowestoft which took place on that day. However, the slower speed of the destroyers in the choppy seas meant that they were left behind and the fleets did not meet. On 1 May, the destroyer picked up the survivors from the armed merchant ship SS San Urbano, which had been sunk by U-81.

At the Battle of Jutland later that year, Marne served as one of four members of the Eleventh Destroyer Flotilla attached to the First and Fourth Battle Squadrons. The flotilla then formed close to the dreadnought battleship King George V when the two fleets converged on 31 May, providing part of the screen for the British battle line. As the German fleet withdrew during the night, the ships were spotted by the vanguard of the High Seas Fleet. The destroyers, led by the light cruiser Castor, attacked the German light cruisers of the 4th Scouting Group, Marne launching a torpedo that failed to impact. The gun flashes from the British cruiser so blinded the crew that they could not fire any more. In return, the destroyer received a hit from a 4.1-inch (100 mm) shell on the upper deck aft which failed to explode. After the end of the battle, the vessel returned to Scapa Flow, arriving on 2 June.

During the following year, Marne was transferred to the Northern Division of the Coast of Ireland Station based at Buncrana. The destroyer was part of the escort service provided to convoys travelling across the Atlantic. The destroyers at Buncrana assisted convoys arriving across the Atlantic Ocean from the American industrial complex at Hampton Roads and via Sydney, Nova Scotia, or departing ports on the Clyde and Mersey. The Division also provided three escorts every eight days to protect fast convoys travelling to and from Halifax, Nova Scotia. On 2 October, the destroyer briefly escorted Drake after the armoured cruiser had been torpedoed by U-79. The convoy escort role continued into 1918. On 20 July, the destroyer, along with sister ships Milbrook and Pigeon, successfully drove the German submarine UB-124 to the surface with depth charges. The ships then sank the submarine with gunfire.

After the Armistice of 11 November 1918 that ended the war, the Royal Navy returned to a peacetime level of strength and both the number of ships and personnel needed to be reduced to save money. Marne was declared superfluous to operational requirements. On 22 October 1919, the destroyer was reduced and placed in reserve at Devonport. However, this did not last long and, after being decommissioned, on 31 November 1921, Marne was sold to G Cohen to be broken up in Germany.

== Pennant numbers ==
Pennant number	Date
HA6	August 1915
G05	January 1917
HA0	March 1918
H38	January 1919
