= HMS Kashmir (1915) =

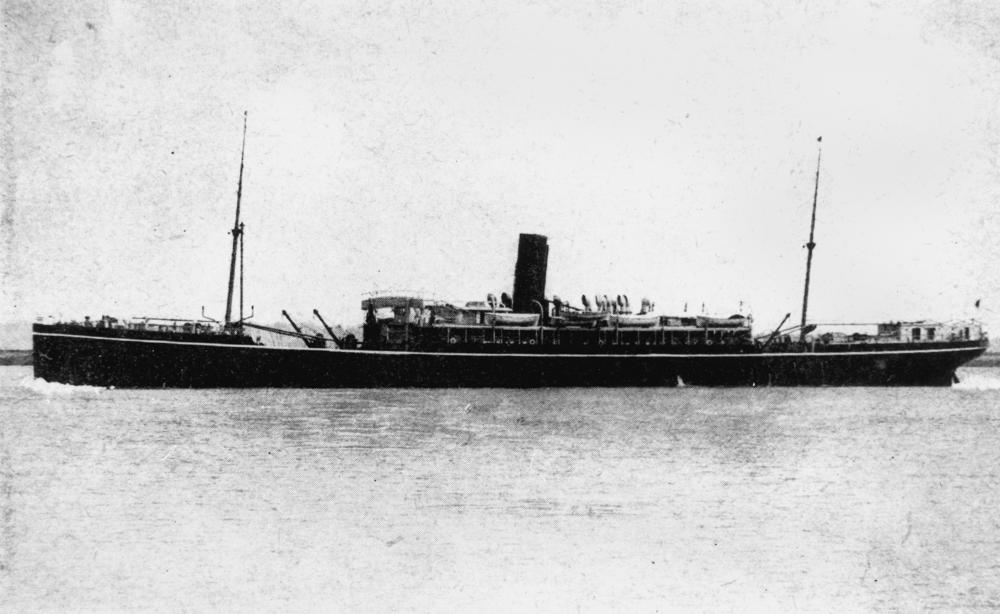
- Kashmir

History

United Kingdom
- Name: SS Kashmir
- Namesake: Kashmir
- Owner: Peninsular and Oriental Steam Navigation Company
- Port of registry: Greenock, UK
- Ordered: 1914?
- Builder: Caird & Company, Greenock
- Cost: £185,396
- Yard number: 329
- Laid down: 1914?
- Launched: 16 February 1915
- Completed: 2 April 1915
- Fate: Requisitioned by the Admiralty, December 1916

History

United Kingdom
- Name: HMS Kashmir
- Acquired: December 1914
- Fate: Returned by the Admiralty, March 1919

History
- Name: SS Kashmir
- Owner: Peninsular and Oriental Steam Navigation Company
- Port of registry: Greenock, UK
- Acquired: March 1919
- Fate: Sold for scrap, 31 July 1932

General characteristics
- Type: Cargo liner
- Tonnage: 8,841 gross register tons (GRT); 5,540 net register tons (NRT)
- Length: 480 ft (146.3 m)
- Beam: 58 ft 3 in (17.8 m)
- Draught: 33 ft 8 in (10.3 m)
- Installed power: 7,000 ihp (5,200 kW)
- Propulsion: 2 × screw propellers; 2 × quadruple-expansion steam engines
- Speed: 14 knots (26 km/h; 16 mph)
- Capacity: Passengers: 78 1st class; 68 2nd class

HMS Kashmir was a British cargo liner built during World War I for the Peninsular and Oriental Steam Navigation Company (P&O)'s Far Eastern routes. She served in that capacity until late 1916 when she was requisitioned for service as a troopship. She collided with the troopship HMS Otranto in 1918 which subsequently ran aground on the Isle of Islay with great loss of life. The ship was returned to the Peninsular and Oriental Steam Navigation Company after the war and remained in service until 1932.

== Description ==
Kashmir had an overall length of 480 feet (146.3 m), a beam of 58 feet 3 inches (17.8 m), and a draught of 33 feet 8 inches (10.3 m). She had a tonnage of 8,841 gross register tons (GRT) and 5,540 net register tons (NRT). The ship was fitted with two 4-cylinder quadruple-expansion steam engines, each driving one propeller. The engines had a total power of 14,000 indicated horsepower (10,000 kW) to give a top speed of 14 to 15 knots (26 to 28 km/h; 16 to 17 mph). She had a capacity of 78 first-class and 68 second-class passengers.

== Construction and career ==
Named for the Indian region of Kashmir, the ship was built by Caird & Company at their Greenock shipyard as yard number 329 for the Peninsular and Oriental Steam Navigation Company (P&O). She was launched on 16 February 1915 and cost £185,396 to build. Kashmir was initially used on the P&O's Far Eastern routes, but was requisitioned by the Admiralty in December 1916 for service as a troopship. She first served in the Mediterranean and then in the North Atlantic.

In September 1918, Kashmir was assigned to Convoy HX-50, ferrying American troops from New York to Liverpool, her third such trip. During the voyage several hundred soldiers came down with the influenza that killed millions of people worldwide. The convoy encountered a strong storm on 4 October that got even stronger over the next several days; by the morning of 6 October it was assessed as a Force 11 storm on the Beaufort scale with mountainous seas. The storm forced the British destroyers that were to rendezvous with them back into port on 5 October and the last American escort departed at 06:00. The weather prevented accurate navigation and the convoy was forced to proceed by dead reckoning. The ship's officers were uncertain if they were off the northern coast of Ireland or the western coast of Scotland. When dawn broke it revealed a rocky coastline 3 to 4 miles (4.8 to 6.4 km) to their east, just ahead of the convoy. Most of the ships correctly thought this was the Scottish coast and turned south, but Otranto's officer of the deck thought that it was the Irish coast and turned north. Kashmir was only about a half mile (0.80 km) to Otranto's north and the turns placed them on a collision course. Both ships attempted to avoid the collision, but their efforts cancelled out and Kashmir rammed Otranto on the port side amidships, a few miles off the rocky coast of Islay.

The collision badly damaged Kashmir's bow and the heavy seas and high winds quickly separated the two ships. They spun the liner around so that she was facing north, into a head sea. In an effort to keep the bow out of the water as much as possible, the captain ordered all of her passengers to the stern and proceeded to Glasgow where she disembarked her passengers.

After she was repaired, Kashmir was loaned to the French to repatriate prisoners of war and then to transport British troops between France and the UK. During one such voyage, her port propeller fell off while leaving Le Havre in January 1919. The ship was returned to her owners in March 1919. After she was restored to her prewar configuration, Kashmir was assigned to the London-Bombay-Far East run for the next decade.

In February 1929, she was rammed by the Belgian collier SS Alexander I and driven aground in the Scheldt estuary. Kashmir was refloated and repaired, but she was later deemed obsolete by her owners and sold for £14,400 to the Japanese scrap dealer T. Okushoji on 31 July 1932.

== Bibliography ==
- Scott, R. Neil (2012). Many Were Held by the Sea: The Tragic Sinking of HMS Otranto. Lanham, Maryland: Rowman & Littlefield. ISBN 978-1-4422-1342-5.
- "SS Kashmir". Clydebuilt Ships Database. Archived from the original on 7 September 2004.
