= HMS Pigeon (1916) =

British M-Class destroyer, WW1

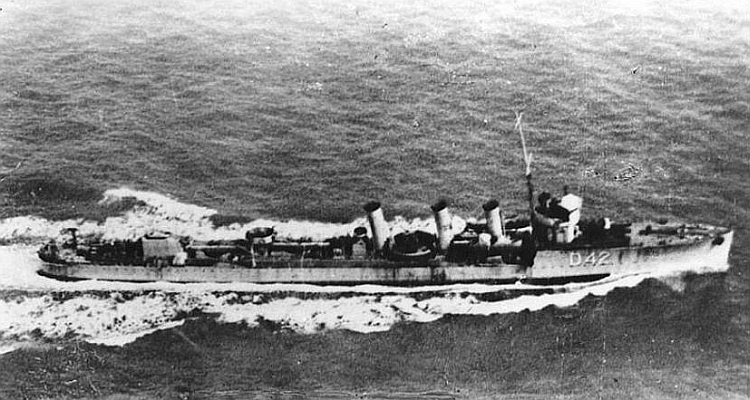
- Sister ship Pasley

History

United Kingdom
- Name: HMS Pigeon
- Namesake: Pigeon
- Ordered: September 1914
- Builder: Hawthorn Leslie and Company, Hebburn
- Laid down: 30 July 1915
- Launched: 3 March 1916
- Completed: 30 June 1916
- Out of service: 9 May 1921
- Fate: Sold to be broken up

General characteristics
- Class & type: Admiralty M-class destroyer
- Displacement: 994 long tons (1,010 t) normal; 1,028 long tons (1,044 t) full load
- Length: 265 ft (80.8 m)
- Beam: 26 ft 7 in (8.1 m)
- Draught: 8 ft 7 in (2.62 m)
- Propulsion: 3 Yarrow boilers; 2 Parsons steam turbines, 25,000 shp (19,000 kW)
- Speed: 34 knots (39.1 mph; 63.0 km/h)
- Range: 3,450 nmi (6,390 km) at 15 kn (28 km/h)
- Complement: 76
- Armament: 3 × QF 4-inch (102 mm) Mark IV guns (3×1); 1 × single 2-pounder (40-mm) "pom-pom" Mk. II anti-aircraft gun (1×1); 4 × 21 in (533 mm) torpedo tubes (2×2)

HMS Pigeon was an Admiralty M-class destroyer which served with the Royal Navy during the First World War. The M class were an improvement on the previous L-class destroyer, capable of higher speed. Launched on 3 March 1916 by Hawthorn Leslie on the River Tyne, the vessel served as part of the Grand Fleet. Pigeon was mainly involved in escorting convoys. After an unsuccessful sortie in October 1917 against German cruisers, the destroyer moved to anti-submarine warfare. In this arena, Pigeon had some success in 1918, rescuing the survivors from the sinking troopship Tuscania in February and assisting in the destruction of the German U-boat UB-124 in July. After the Armistice, the destroyer was redeployed to serve as part of the Nore Local Defence flotilla until being decommissioned and sold to be broken up on 9 May 1921.

== Design and development ==
Pigeon was one of sixteen Admiralty M-class destroyer destroyers ordered by the British Admiralty in May 1915 as part of the Fifth War Construction Programme. The M-class was an improved version of the earlier L-class destroyer destroyers, required to reach a higher speed in order to counter rumoured German fast destroyers. It transpired that the German ships did not exist but the greater performance was appreciated by the navy. The vessels ordered as part of the programme differed from earlier members of the class in having a raking stem and are sometimes known as the Repeat M class.

The destroyer was 265 feet (80.77 m) long overall, with a beam of 26 feet 7 inches (8.10 m) and a draught of 8 feet 7 inches (2.62 m). displacement was 994 long tons (1,010 t) normal and 1,028 long tons (1,044 t) full load. Power was provided by three Yarrow boilers feeding two Parsons steam turbines rated at 25,000 shaft horsepower (19,000 kW) and driving two shafts, to give a design speed of 34 knots (63 km/h; 39 mph). Three funnels were fitted. 296 long tons (301 t) of oil were carried, giving a design range of 3,450 nautical miles (6,390 km; 3,970 mi) at 15 knots (28 km/h; 17 mph).

Armament consisted of three 4 in (102 mm) Mk IV QF guns on the ship's centreline, with one on the forecastle, one aft on a raised platform and one between the middle and aft funnels. A single 2-pounder (40 mm) pom-pom anti-aircraft gun was carried, while torpedo armament consisted of two twin mounts for 21 in (533 mm) torpedoes. The ship had a complement of 76 officers and ratings.

== Construction and career ==
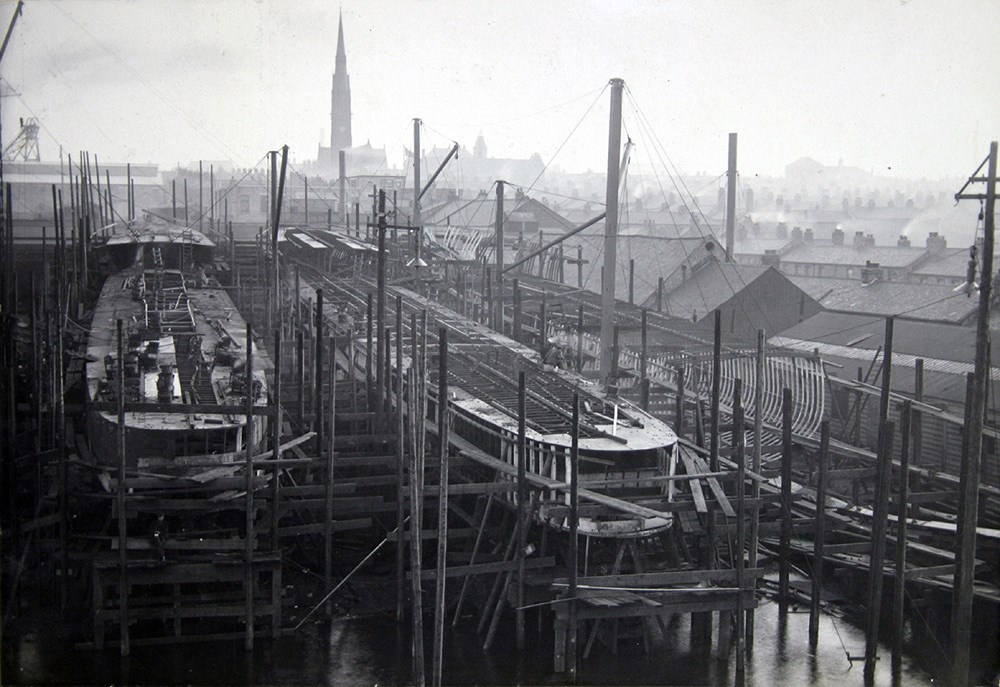
Pigeon under construction alongside Plover and Sarpedon

Pigeon was laid down by Hawthorn Leslie and Company of Hebburn on the River Tyne on 14 July 1915, launched on 3 March the following year and completed on 2 June. The ship was the eighth named after the eponymous family of birds. The vessel was deployed as part of the Grand Fleet, joining the Thirteenth Destroyer Flotilla.

Pigeon spent much of the war escorting convoys. On 16 October 1917, the ship formed part of a fleet of eighty-four ships, including fifty-four destroyers, that were deployed to protect convoys travelling from Scandinavia. The deployment was a failure, with two British destroyers sunk by German cruisers while Pigeon did not even sight the enemy. While sailing as part of another convoy, the troopship Tuscania was torpedoed by the German submarine UB-77 on 5 February 1918. Pigeon joined in the rescue operation, which saved more than eight hundred US troops. Later in the year, on 20 July, the destroyer, along with sister ships Marne and Millbrook, was credited with sinking UB-124. The destroyers expended fifty depth charges, an unusually large amount for the time, damaging the submarine's batteries and driving the enemy vessel to the surface where it was abandoned and sunk.

After the armistice, Pigeon was allocated to the Nore Local Defence flotilla. However, within a few years, the Royal Navy returned to a peacetime level of mobilisation and the destroyer fleet was reduced dramatically. The vessel was decommissioned and, on 9 May 1921, sold to Thos. W. Ward of New Holland to be broken up.

== Pennant numbers ==
Pennant number	Date
G59	1915
F21	1917
F18	1918
H67	1918
