= List of monitors of the Royal Navy =

This is a list of monitors of the Royal Navy of the United Kingdom.

== Key ==
Main guns	The number and type of the main battery guns
Displacement	Ship displacement at standard combat load
Propulsion	Number of shafts, type of propulsion system
Laid down	The date the keel began to be assembled
Commissioned	The date the ship was commissioned
Fate	The fate of the ship

== Humber-class ==
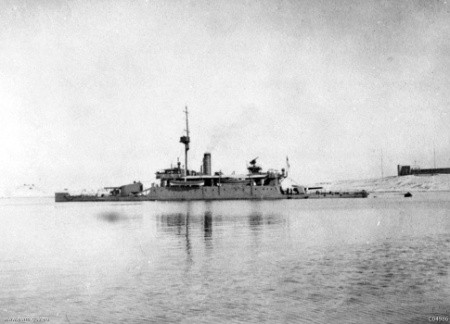
HMS Humber

The Humber-class monitors were three river monitors under construction for the Brazilian Navy in Britain in 1913, all three were taken over by the Royal Navy shortly before the outbreak of the First World War and were commissioned as small monitors, seeing extensive service during the war.

Ship	Main guns	Displacement	Propulsion	Service		
Ship	Main guns	Displacement	Propulsion	Laid down	Acquired	Fate
HMS Humber (ex-Javary)	2 × 6 in (15 cm)	1,260 long tons (1,280 t)	2 × shafts triple expansion engines 2 × boilers	24 Aug 1912	8 Aug 1914	Sold to F. Rijsdijk 17 Sep 1920 for use as a crane lighter
HMS Mersey (ex-Madeira)	2 × 6 in (15 cm)	1,260 long tons (1,280 t)	2 × shafts triple expansion engines 2 × boilers	24 Aug 1912	3 Aug 1914	Sold for scrap 1921
HMS Severn (ex-Solimoes)	2 × 6 in (15 cm)	1,260 long tons (1,280 t)	2 × shafts triple expansion engines 2 × boilers	24 Aug 1912	8 Aug 1914	Sold for scrap 9 May 1921

== Abercrombie-class ==
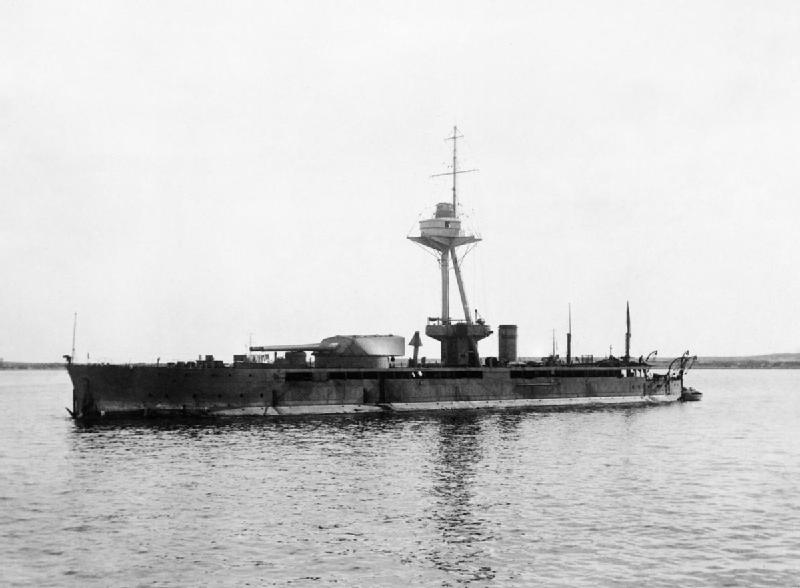
HMS Havelock

The Abercrombie-class monitors came about when Bethlehem Steel in the United States, the contracted supplier of the main armament for the Greek battleship Salamis being built in Germany, instead offered to sell the four 14"/45 caliber gun twin gun turrets to the Royal Navy on 3 November 1914, the ships were laid down and launched within six months, seeing service throughout the war.

Ship	Main guns	Displacement	Propulsion	Service		
Ship	Main guns	Displacement	Propulsion	Laid down	Commissioned	Fate
HMS Abercrombie	2 × 14 in (36 cm)	6,150 long tons (6,250 t)	2 × vertical triple expansion reciprocating engines 2 × boilers	12 Dec 1914	1 May 1915	Sold for scrap 25 Jun 1927
HMS Havelock	2 × 14 in (36 cm)	6,150 long tons (6,250 t)	2 × vertical triple expansion reciprocating engines 2 × boilers	12 Dec 1914	May 1915	Sold for scrap 25 Jun 1921
HMS Raglan	2 × 14 in (36 cm)	6,150 long tons (6,250 t)	2 × vertical triple expansion reciprocating engines 2 × boilers	1 Dec 1914	May 1915	Sunk 20 Jan 1918
HMS Roberts	2 × 14 in (36 cm)	6,150 long tons (6,250 t)	2 × vertical triple expansion reciprocating engines 2 × boilers	17 Dec 1914	21 May 1915	Sold for scrap Sep 1936

== Lord Clive-class ==
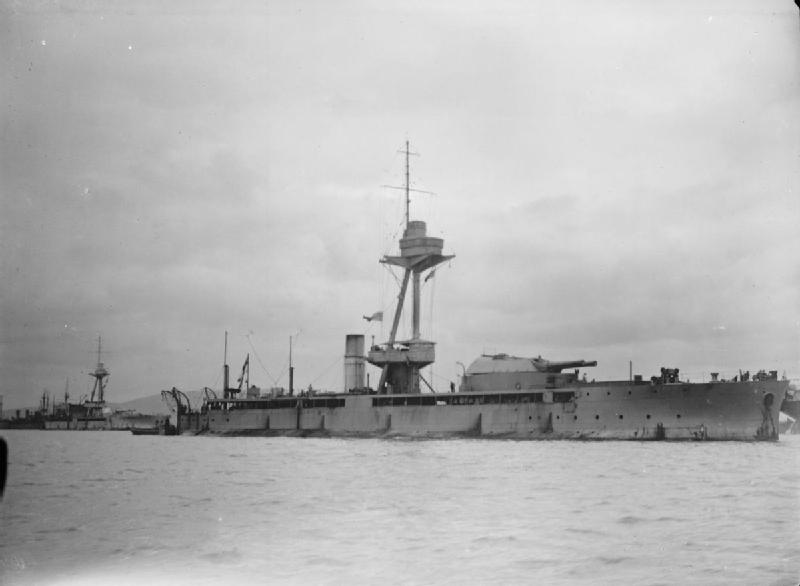
HMS Earl of Peterborough

The Lord Clive-class monitors, sometimes referred to as the General Wolfe-class, were built to meet the need for more shore bombardment ships, using twin 12-inch (305 mm) gun turrets taken from decommissioned Majestic-class pre-dreadnought battleships. Three of the ships, HMS General Wolfe, Lord Clive and Prince Eugene, were converted to take the BL 18 inch Mk I naval gun that had originally been allocated to HMS Furious.

Ship	Main guns	Displacement	Propulsion	Service		
Ship	Main guns	Displacement	Propulsion	Laid down	Acquired	Fate
HMS Lord Clive	2 × 12 in (30 cm) later also 1 × 18 in (46 cm)	6,150 long tons (6,250 t)	2 × shafts reciprocating steam engines 2 × boilers	9 January 1915	10 July 1915	Sold for scrap 10 October 1927
HMS General Craufurd	2 × 12 in (30 cm)	6,150 long tons (6,250 t)	2 × shafts reciprocating steam engines 2 × boilers	9 January 1915	26 August 1915	Sold for scrap 1921
HMS Earl of Peterborough	2 × 12 in (30 cm)	6,150 long tons (6,250 t)	2 × shafts reciprocating steam engines 2 × boilers	16 January 1915	23 September 1915	Sold for scrap 1921
HMS Sir Thomas Picton	2 × 12 in (30 cm)	6,150 long tons (6,250 t)	2 × shafts reciprocating steam engines 2 × boilers	16 January 1915	30 September 1915	Sold for scrap 1921
HMS Prince Eugene	2 × 12 in (30 cm) conversion to 1 × 18 in (46 cm) incomplete at armistice	6,150 long tons (6,250 t)	2 × shafts reciprocating steam engines 2 × boilers	1 February 1915	September 1915	Sold for scrap 1921
HMS Prince Rupert	2 × 12 in (30 cm)	6,150 long tons (6,250 t)	2 × shafts reciprocating steam engines 2 × boilers	12 January 1915	May 1915	Sold for scrap 1923
HMS Sir John Moore	2 × 12 in (30 cm)	6,150 long tons (6,250 t)	2 × shafts reciprocating steam engines 2 × boilers	13 January 1915	May 1915	Sold for scrap 1921
HMS General Wolfe	2 × 12 in (30 cm) later also 1 × 18 in (46 cm)	6,150 long tons (6,250 t)	2 × shafts reciprocating steam engines 2 × boilers	January 1915	27 October 1915	Sold for scrap 1923

== Marshal Ney-class ==
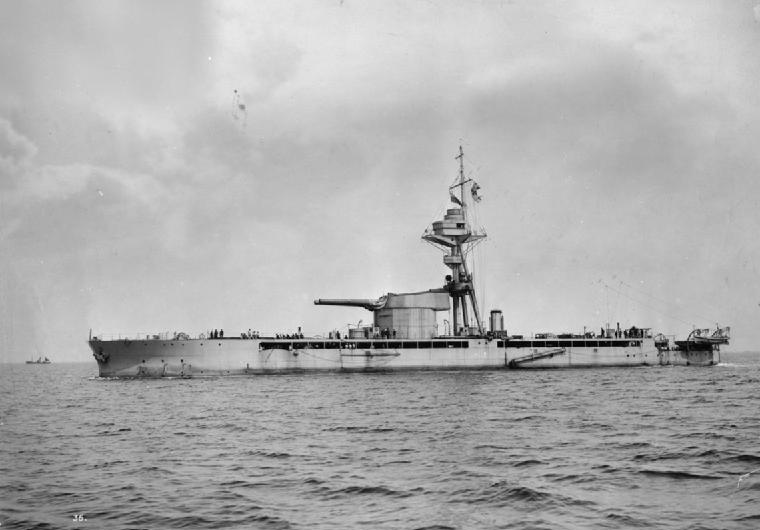
HMS Marshal Ney

The Marshal Ney-class monitors were built to use the two modern 15-inch turrets made available by the redesign of Renown and Repulse as battlecruisers.

Ship	Main guns	Displacement	Propulsion	Service		
Ship	Main guns	Displacement	Propulsion	Laid down	Commissioned	Fate
HMS Marshal Soult	2 × 15 in (38 cm)	6,670 long tons (6,780 t)	2 × shafts Diesel engines		August 1918	Sold for scrap 10 July 1946
HMS Marshal Ney	2 × 15 in (38 cm)	6,670 long tons (6,780 t)	2 × shafts Diesel engines		August 1915	Sold for scrap 1957

== Gorgon-class ==
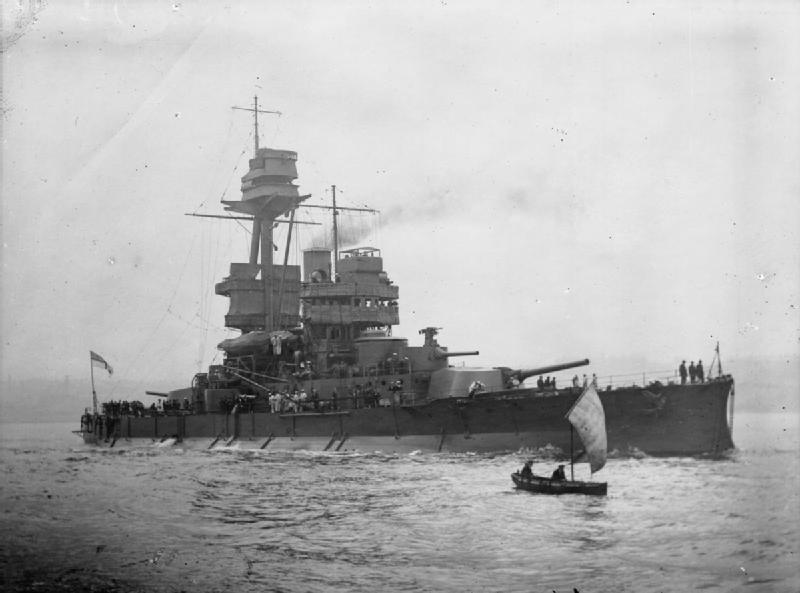
HMS Glatton

The Gorgon-class monitors were originally built as coastal defence ships for the Royal Norwegian Navy, but requisitioned for British use.

Ship	Main guns	Displacement	Propulsion	Service		
Ship	Main guns	Displacement	Propulsion	Laid down	Commissioned	Fate
HMS Gorgon (ex-Nidaros)	2 × 9.2 in (23 cm)	5,746 long tons (5,838 t)	2 × shafts Vertical triple-expansion steam engines 4 × boilers	11 June 1913	1 May 1918	Sold for scrap 26 August 1928
HMS Glatton (ex-Bjørgvin)	2 × 9.2 in (23 cm)	5,746 long tons (5,838 t)	2 × shafts Vertical triple-expansion steam engines 4 × boilers	26 May 1913	31 August 1918	Wrecked by explosion 16 September 1918, 79 killed

== M15-class ==
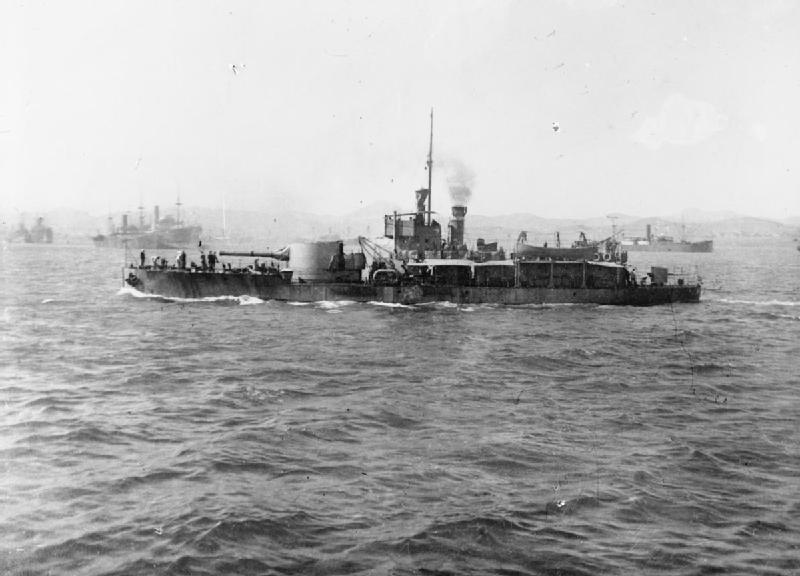
HMS M15

The M15-class monitors were fourteen ships ordered in March 1915, as part of the War Emergency Programme of ship construction, mounting 9.2 inch Mk VI gun turrets removed from the Edgar-class and the Mk X turrets held in stock for the Drake-class and Cressy-class cruisers.

Ship	Main guns	Displacement	Propulsion	Service		
Ship	Main guns	Displacement	Propulsion	Laid down	Commissioned	Fate
HMS M15	1 × 9.2 in (23 cm)	540 long tons (550 t)	4 × shafts 4-cylinder semi-diesel engines	1 March 1915	June 1915	Sunk by UC-38 on 11 November 1917, 26 killed.
HMS M16	1 × 9.2 in (23 cm)	540 long tons (550 t)	4 × shafts 4-cylinder semi-diesel engines	1 March 1915	June 1915	Sold 29 January 1920
HMS M17	1 × 9.2 in (23 cm)	540 long tons (550 t)	4 × shafts 4-cylinder semi-diesel engines	1 March 1915	June 1915	Sold 12 May 1920
HMS M18	1 × 9.2 in (23 cm)	540 long tons (550 t)	4 × shafts 4-cylinder semi-diesel engines	1 March 1915	July 1915	Sold 29 January 1920
HMS M19	1 × 9.2 in (23 cm)	540 long tons (550 t)	4 × shafts 4-cylinder semi-diesel engines	1 March 1915	June 1915	Sold 12 May 1920
HMS M20	1 × 9.2 in (23 cm)	540 long tons (550 t)	4 × shafts 4-cylinder semi-diesel engines	1 March 1915	July 1915	Sold 29 January 1920
HMS M21	1 × 9.2 in (23 cm) later 1 × 7.5 in (19 cm)	540 long tons (550 t)	2 × shafts Triple Expansion steam engines	1 March 1915	July 1915	Sunk 20 October 1918 off Dover
HMS M22 (later HMS Medea)	1 × 9.2 in (23 cm)	540 long tons (550 t)	2 × shafts Triple Expansion steam engines	1 March 1915	August 1915	Converted to a minelayer in 1920, renamed HMS Medea 1925, became a training ship 1937, sold 1938, wrecked 2 January 1939
HMS M23 (later RNVR Claverhouse)	1 × 9.2 in (23 cm) later 1 × 7.5 in (19 cm)	540 long tons (550 t)	4 × shafts 4-cylinder semi-diesel engines	1 March 1915	July 1915	Became a Royal Naval Volunteer Reserve drillship, and was renamed Claverhouse in 1922, sold 1959
HMS M24	1 × 9.2 in (23 cm) later 1 × 7.5 in (19 cm)	540 long tons (550 t)	4 × shafts Campbell 4-cylinder paraffin engines	1 March 1915	August 1915	Sold 29 January 1920 for conversion to a mercantile oil tanker, and renamed Satoe
HMS M25	1 × 9.2 in (23 cm) later 1 × 7.5 in (19 cm)	540 long tons (550 t)	4 × shafts 4-cylinder semi-diesel engines	1 March 1915	September 1915	Scuttled in the Dvina River 16 September 1919
HMS M26	1 × 9.2 in (23 cm) later 1 × 7.5 in (19 cm)	540 long tons (550 t)	4 × shafts 4-cylinder semi-diesel engines	1 March 1915	October 1915	Sold 29 January 1920
HMS M27	1 × 9.2 in (23 cm) later 1 × 6 in (15 cm)	540 long tons (550 t)	4 × shafts 4-cylinder semi-diesel engines	1 March 1915	November 1915	Scuttled in the Dvina River 16 September 1919
HMS M28	1 × 9.2 in (23 cm) later 1 × 6 in (15 cm)	540 long tons (550 t)	4 × shafts 4-cylinder semi-diesel engines	1 March 1915	August 1915	Sunk during the Battle of Imbros on 20 January 1918, 11 killed

== M29-class ==
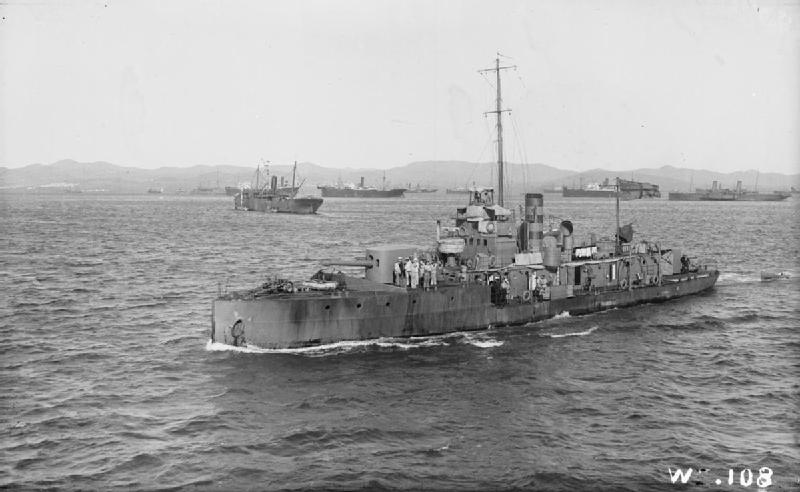
HMS M30

The M29-class monitors were five ships ordered in March 1915, as part of the War Emergency Programme of ship construction.

Ship	Main guns	Displacement	Propulsion	Service		
Ship	Main guns	Displacement	Propulsion	Laid down	Commissioned	Fate
HMS M29 (later HMS Medusa, HMS Talbot & HMS Medway II)	2 × 6 in (15 cm)	535 long tons (544 t)	4 × shafts Triple expansion engines. Oil fuel 45 tons boilers	1 March 1915	June 1915	Converted to minelayer and renames HMS Medusa in 1925, converted to a repair ship and became the depot ship and renames HMS Talbot in 1941, again renamed HMS Medway II in 1944, sold in December 1946 for breaking
HMS M30	2 × 6 in (15 cm)	535 long tons (544 t)	4 × shafts Triple expansion engines. Oil fuel 45 tons boilers	1 March 1915	July 1915	Sunk by shore batteries at the Gulf of Smyrna 14 May 1916
HMS M31 (later HMS Melpomene, then HMS Menelaus)	2 × 6 in (15 cm)	535 long tons (544 t)	4 × shafts Triple expansion engines. Oil fuel 45 tons boilers	1 March 1915	July 1915	Converted to minelayer in 1923, renamed HMS Melpomene in 1925, converted to a torpedo training vessel in 1939, renamed HMS Menelaus in 1941, in 1944, sold in 1948 for breaking
HMS M32	2 × 6 in (15 cm)	535 long tons (544 t)	4 × shafts Triple expansion engines. Oil fuel 45 tons boilers	1 March 1915	June 1915	Sold in January 1920 for use as an oil tanker, and named Ampat
HMS M33 (later HMS Minerva and Hulk C23)	2 × 6 in (15 cm)	535 long tons (544 t)	4 × shafts Triple expansion engines. Oil fuel 45 tons boilers	1 March 1915	June 1915	Converted to mine-laying training ship and was renamed HMS Minerva in 1925, later became a fuelling hulk and boom defence workshop, renamed Hulk C23, currently museum ship at Portsmouth

== Erebus-class ==
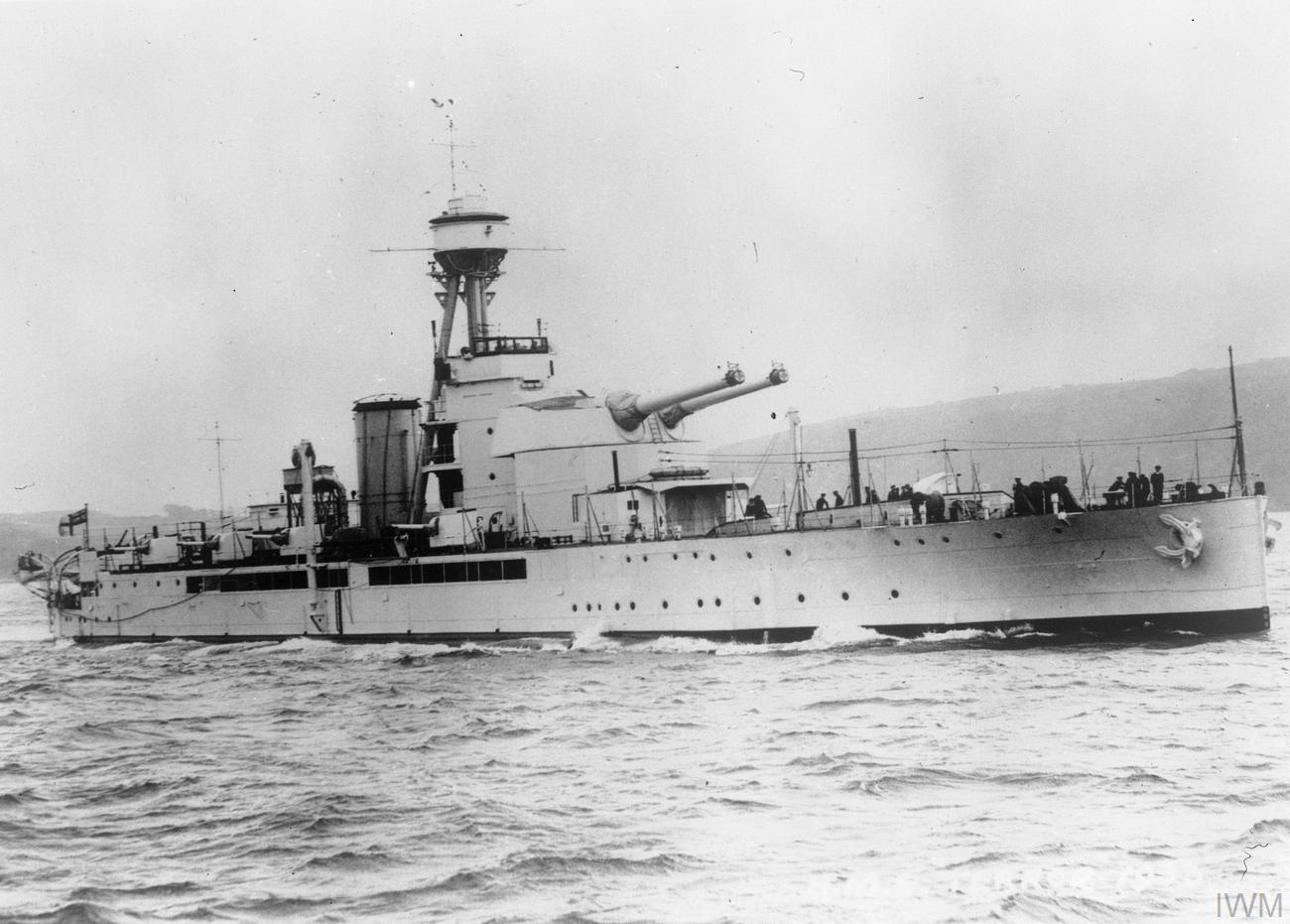
HMS Terror

The Erebus-class monitors were two ships mounting a single twin BL 15 inch Mk I naval gun turret. They saw active service in World War I off the Belgian coast, were placed in reserve between the wars then served in World War II, with Terror being lost in 1941 and Erebus surviving to be scrapped in 1946.

Ship	Main guns	Displacement	Propulsion	Service		
Ship	Main guns	Displacement	Propulsion	Laid down	Commissioned	Fate
HMS Erebus	2 × 15 in (38 cm)	8,000 long tons (8,100 t)	2 × shafts 4 x oil-fired boilers	12 October 1915	2 September 1916	Scrapped July 1946
HMS Terror	2 × 15 in (38 cm)	8,000 long tons (8,100 t)	2 × shafts 4 x oil-fired boilers	26 October 1915	6 August 1916	Sunk 23 February 1941 off Derna, Libya

== Roberts-class ==
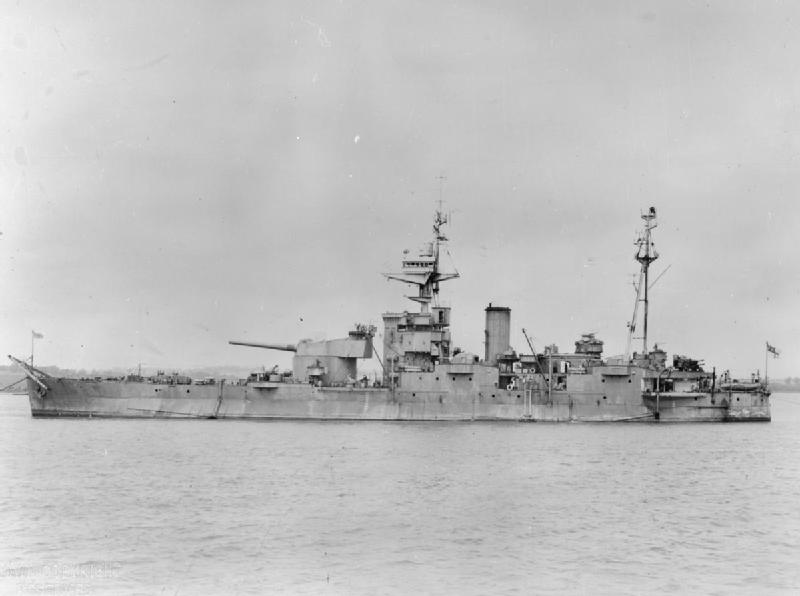
HMS Abercrombie

The Roberts-class monitors were two ships mounting a single twin BL 15 inch Mk I naval gun turret built during the Second World War, featuring shallow draught for operating inshore, broad beam to give stability and a high observation platform to observe fall of shot.

Ship	Main guns	Displacement	Propulsion	Service		
Ship	Main guns	Displacement	Propulsion	Laid down	Commissioned	Fate
HMS Roberts	2 × 15 in (38 cm)	7,970 long tons (8,100 t)	2 × shafts 2 × Parsons steam turbines 2 × boilers	30 April 1940	27 October 1941	Sold for scrap June 1965
HMS Abercrombie	2 × 15 in (38 cm)	8,536 long tons (8,673 t)	2 × shafts 2 × Parsons steam turbines 2 × boilers	26 April 1941	5 May 1943	Scrapped 24 December 1954

== See also ==
- List of monitors of the United States Navy
