= HMS M27 =

History

United Kingdom
- Name: HMS M27
- Builder: Sir Raylton Dixon & Co.
- Laid down: 1 March 1915
- Launched: 8 September 1915
- Fate: Scuttled in the Dvina River 16 September 1919

General characteristics
- Class & type: M15 class monitor
- Displacement: 540 tons
- Length: 177 ft 3 in (54.03 m)
- Beam: 31 ft (9.4 m)
- Draught: 6 ft 9 in (2.06 m)
- Propulsion: 4 shaft; Bolinder 2 cylinder semi-diesel; 560 hp
- Speed: 11 knots
- Complement: 69
- Armament: As built; 1 × BL 9.2 inch Mk VI gun; 1 × 12-pdr (76 mm) QF Mk 1 gun; 1 × 6 pdr (57 mm) QF MK 1 AA gun; 1918; 1 × BL 6-inch (150 mm) MK VII gun; 1 × QF 3-inch (76 mm) AA gun; 1 × 12-pdr (76 mm) QF Mk 1 gun; 2 × QF 2-pounder Mark II; 1919; 1 × BL 4-inch (100 mm) triple Mk IX gun; 2 × QF 3-inch (76 mm) AA gun; 2 × QF 2-pounder Mark II

HMS M27 was a First World War Royal Navy M15-class monitor. She was also served in the British intervention in Russia in 1919, and was scuttled in the Dvina River on 16 September 1919.

== Design ==
Intended as a shore bombardment vessel, M27's primary armament was a single 9.2 inch Mk VI gun removed from the Edgar-class cruiser HMS Theseus. In addition to her 9.2 inch gun she also possessed one 12 pounder and one six pound anti-aircraft gun. She was equipped with a four shaft Bolinder two cylinder semi-diesel engine with 560 horse power that allowed a top speed of eleven knots. The monitor's crew consisted of sixty nine officers and men.

== Construction ==
HMS M27 ordered in March, 1915, as part of the War Emergency Programme of ship construction. She was laid down at the Sir Raylton Dixon & Co. Ltd shipyard in March 1915, launched on 8 September 1915, and completed in November 1915.

== World War 1 ==
M27 served with the Dover Patrol from December 1915 to December 1918. In early 1916, M27 had her main 9.2 in gun removed, as it was required for artillery use on the Western Front, and a QF 6-inch (150 mm) MK I/II gun from HMS Redoubtable was fitted in lieu. This was later replaced by a 6-inch (152.4 mm) MK VII gun.

== Russia ==
M27 next saw service, along with five other monitors (M23, M25, M31, M33 and HMS Humber), which were sent to Murmansk in May 1919 to relieve the North Russian Expeditionary Force. Prior to departure to Russia, M27 had her main armament replaced by a BL 4-inch (101.6 mm) triple Mk IX gun, and her 12-pdr (76 mm) QF Mk 1 gun replaced by a QF 3-inch (76 mm) AA gun.

In June, 1919, M27 moved to Archangel and her shallow draught enabled her to travel up the Dvina River to cover the withdrawal of British and White Russian forces. M27 and her sister ship M25 were unable to be recovered when the river level fell and were scuttled on 16 September 1919 after running aground.
