= HMS M25 =

History

United Kingdom
- Name: HMS M25
- Builder: Sir Raylton Dixon & Co.
- Laid down: 1 March 1915
- Launched: 24 July 1915
- Fate: Scuttled in the Dvina River 16 September 1919

General characteristics
- Class & type: M15 class monitor
- Displacement: 540 tons
- Length: 177 ft 3 in (54.03 m)
- Beam: 31 ft (9.4 m)
- Draught: 6 ft 9 in (2.06 m)
- Propulsion: 4-shaft; Bolinder 4-cylinder semi-diesel; 640 hp
- Speed: 11 knots
- Complement: 69
- Armament: As built; 1 × BL 9.2 inch Mk VI gun; 1 × 12-pdr (76 mm) QF Mk 1 gun; 1 × 6-pdr (57 mm) QF MK 1 AA gun; 1918; 1 × BL 7.5-inch (190 mm) MK III gun; 1 × QF 3-inch (76 mm) AA gun; 1 × 12-pdr (76 mm) QF Mk 1 gun

HMS M25 was a First World War Royal Navy M15-class monitor. She was also served in the British intervention in Russia in 1919, and was scuttled in the Dvina River on 16 September 1919.

== Design ==
Intended as a shore bombardment vessel, M25's primary armament was a single 9.2 inch Mk VI gun removed from the Edgar-class cruiser HMS Endymion. In addition to her 9.2-inch gun she also possessed one 12 pounder and one six-pounder anti-aircraft gun. She was equipped with a four-shaft Bolinder four-cylinder semi-diesel engine with 640 horsepower that allowed a top speed of eleven knots. The monitor's crew consisted of sixty-nine officers and men.

== Construction ==
HMS M25 ordered in March, 1915, as part of the War Emergency Programme of ship construction. She was laid down at the Sir Raylton Dixon & Co. Ltd shipyard in March 1915, launched on 24 July 1915, and completed in September 1915.

== World War 1 ==
M25 served with the Dover Patrol from September 1915 to June 1918. In early 1916, M25 had her main 9.2 in gun removed, as it was required for artillery use on the Western Front, and a BL 7.5-inch (190 mm) MK III gun from HMS Swiftsure was fitted in lieu.

== Russia ==
M25 next saw service, along with five other monitors (M23, M27, M31, M33 and HMS Humber), which were sent to Murmansk in May 1919 to relieve the North Russian Expeditionary Force.

In June 1919, M25 moved to Archangel and her shallow draught enabled her to travel up the Dvina River to cover the withdrawal of British and White Russian forces. M25 and her sister ship M27 were unable to be recovered when the river level fell and were scuttled on 16 September 1919 after running aground.
