= HMS M21 =

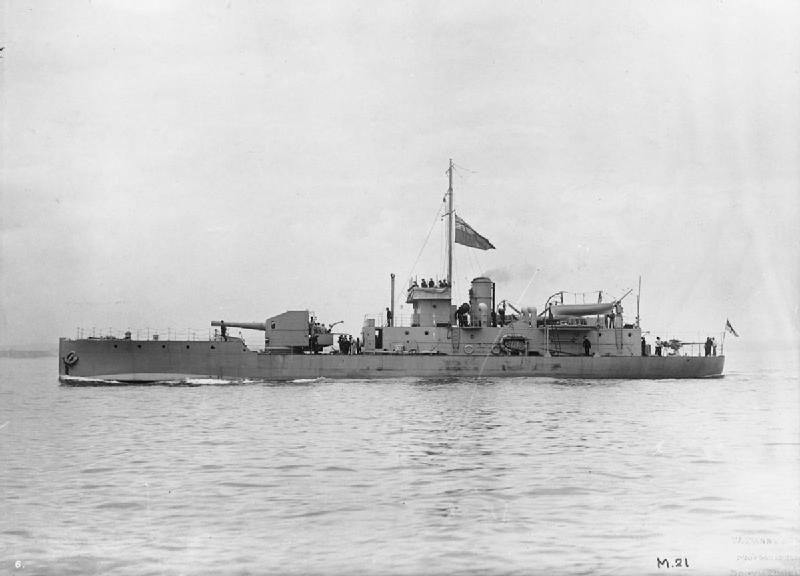

History

United Kingdom
- Name: HMS M21
- Builder: Sir Raylton Dixon & Co.
- Laid down: 1 March 1915
- Launched: 27 May 1915
- Fate: Sunk 20 October 1918 off Dover

General characteristics
- Class & type: M15 class monitor
- Displacement: 540 tons
- Length: 177 ft 3 in (54.03 m)
- Beam: 31 ft (9.4 m)
- Draught: 6 ft 9 in (2.06 m)
- Propulsion: 2 shaft; Triple Expansion steam engines; 600 ihp
- Speed: 11 knots
- Complement: 69
- Armament: As built; 1 × BL 9.2 inch Mk VI gun; 1 × 12-pdr (76 mm) QF Mk 1 gun; 1 × 6-pdr (57 mm) QF MK 1 AA gun; 1918; 1 × BL 7.5-inch (190.5 mm) Mk III 50-caliber gun; 1 × QF 3-inch (76.20 mm) AA gun; 1 × 12-pdr (76 mm) QF Mk 1 gun

HMS M21 was a First World War Royal Navy M15-class monitor. After service in the Mediterranean and the Dover Patrol, she struck a mine off Ostend in January 1918 and sank off Dover.

== Design ==
Intended as a shore bombardment vessel, M21's primary armament was a single 9.2 inch Mk VI gun removed from the Edgar-class cruiser HMS Theseus. In addition to her 9.2 inch gun, she also possessed one 12 pounder and one six pound anti-aircraft gun. Due to the shortage of Bolinder diesel engines that equipped her sisters, she was fitted with two shaft, triple-expansion steam engines, that allowed a top speed of eleven knots. The monitor's crew consisted of sixty nine officers and men.

== Construction ==
HMS M21 ordered in March, 1915, as part of the War Emergency Programme of ship construction. She was laid down at the Sir Raylton Dixon & Co. Ltd shipyard at Govan in March 1915, launched on 27 May 1915, and completed in July 1915.

== World War I ==
M21 served initially in the Mediterranean from September 1915. On her return from the Mediterranean in September 1917, M21 had her main 9.2 in gun removed, as it was required for artillery use on the Western Front, and a BL 7.5-inch (190.5 mm) Mk III 50-caliber gun was fitted in lieu.

M21 then served with the Dover Patrol from October 1917.

== Loss ==
M21 struck a mine off Ostend on 20 October 1918. She was taken in tow to Dover, but sank off West Pier.
