= HMS Grafton (1892) =

Cruiser of the Royal Navy

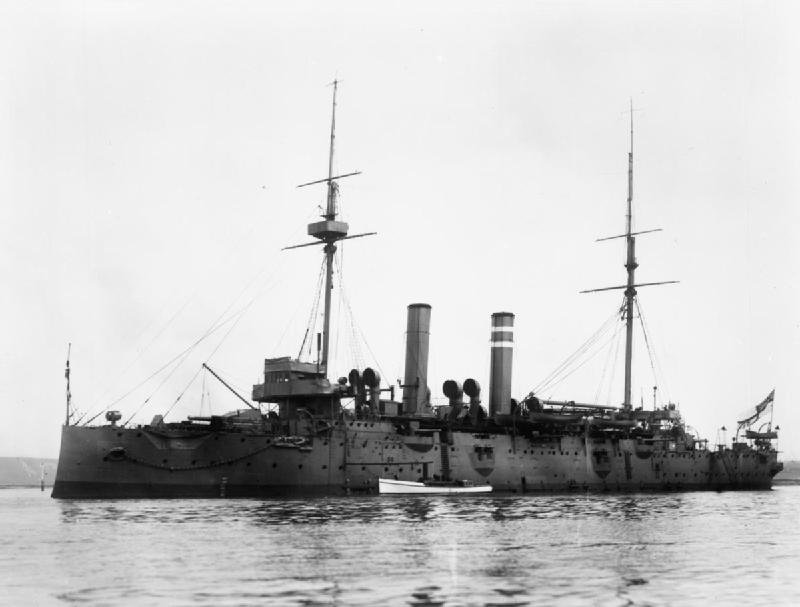
- HMS Grafton

History

United Kingdom
- Name: HMS Grafton
- Builder: Thames Ironworks and Shipbuilding Company
- Laid down: 1 January 1890
- Launched: 30 January 1892
- Commissioned: Portsmouth 10 September 1895
- Fate: Sold for breaking up 1 July 1920

General characteristics
- Class & type: Edgar-class cruiser
- Displacement: 7,350 tons
- Length: 387.5 ft (118.1 m)
- Beam: 60 ft (18 m)
- Armament: 2 × BL 9.2-inch (233.7 mm) Mk VI guns; 10 × QF 6-inch (152.4 mm) guns; 12 × 6-pounder guns

HMS Grafton was a first class cruiser of the Edgar class, launched in 1892. She served in colonial service and in the First World War. Grafton survived the war and was broken up in the 1920s.

== Construction ==
Grafton was laid down at the Thames Ironworks and Shipbuilding Company's London shipyard on 1 January 1890, and launched on 30 January 1892. She undertook sea trials in June 1893, maintaining a speed of 19 1/2 knots (36.1 km/h; 22.4 mph) with her engines under natural draught, where they produced 10,957 indicated horsepower (8,171 kW), and 20 1/5 knots (37.4 km/h; 23.2 mph) with engines under forced draught, when they were measured at 13,484 indicated horsepower (10,055 kW).

== Service ==
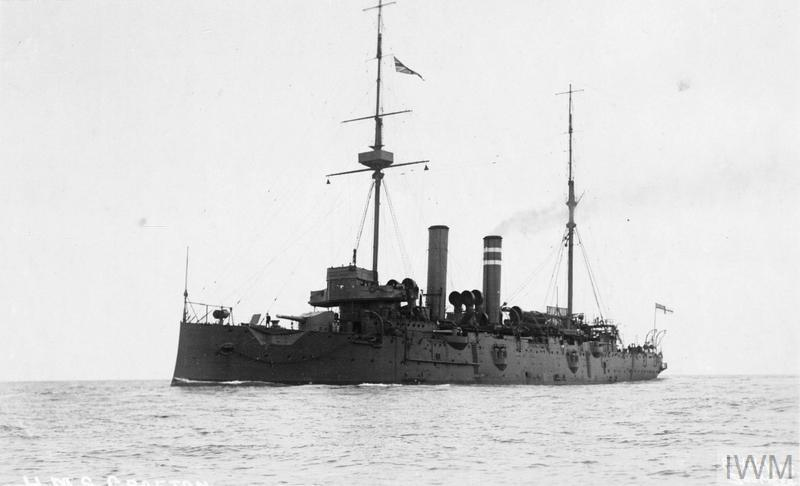
Grafton

Commissioned at Portsmouth on 10 September 1895, she served in the China sea on the China station from 22 April 1896 until 10 September 1899.

In December 1901 she was ordered to relieve Warspite as flagship on the Pacific Station. She was commissioned at Chatham on 14 January 1902, with a complement of 571 officers and men. Leaving Plymouth on 31 January 1902, she stopped at Madeira, São Vicente, Montevideo and Sandy Point before arriving at the garrison of the Pacific station in Valparaíso in mid-March. Rear-Admiral Andrew Bickford hoisted his flag as Commander-in-Chief, Pacific Station, on Grafton a couple of days later. Captain Colin Richard Keppel transferred as flag captain from Warspite to Grafton on the same day, changing places with Marx.

On 18 April 1902 Grafton landed two parties of fully armed sailors at San José, Guatemala, to suppress the revolutionary disturbance caused by the United Kingdom's efforts to obtain re-payment of a loan from the Guatemalan government. The show of force sufficed, and the government paid. In December that year she visited Monterey, San Diego, Mazatlán and Acapulco. On 31 January 1903 Grafton was on passage from Callao, Peru to Coquimbo, Chile, when she struck and killed a large (estimated at 60 feet (18 m) long) whale.

On the outbreak of the First World War, Grafton was part of the 10th Cruiser Squadron, which was employed in enforcing the naval blockade of Germany. In December 1914, with the Edgar class having proved unsuitable for blockade work in the North Sea, Grafton was withdrawn from active service, with her two 9.2 inch guns removed to arm the M15-class monitors M23 and M28. It was decided to refit four ships of the Edgar class, including Grafton, for shore bombardment work for the planned operations in the Dardanelles. Two 6 inch guns replaced the 9.2 inch weapons and anti-torpedo bulges were fitted. These reduced the ship's speed by 4 knots (7.4 km/h; 4.6 mph).

Grafton, along with her sisters Endymion, Edgar and Theseus, served in the Gallipoli Campaign from July 1915. Grafton carried out shore bombardment during the landing at Suvla Bay and the Battle of Sari Bair in August 1915. She was struck by Turkish shells off Suvla on 12 August, killing nine of her crew. Grafton helped to cover the evacuations from Anzac Cove on 20 December 1915 and from Cape Helles in January 1916. Grafton was later awarded the battle honour "DARDANELLES, Feb 1915- Jan 1916" for her service off Gallipoli.

On 10 June 1917, Grafton was torpedoed by the German U-boat UB-43 150 nautical miles (280 km) east of Malta. Grafton's anti-torpedo bulges proved effective and damage was limited, ennabling her to steam into port at Malta under her own power with no casualties. She later took part in the Battle of Jaffa.

Grafton was sold for breaking up at Plymouth on 1 July 1920.

== Sources ==
- Brown, David K. (2010). The Grand Fleet: Warship Design and Development 1906–1922. Barnsley, UK: Seaforth Publishing. ISBN 978-1-84832-085-7.
- Chesneau, Roger; Kolesnik, Eugene M., eds. (1979). Conway's All The World's Fighting Ships 1860–1905. London: Conway Maritime Press. ISBN 0-85177-133-5.
- Colledge, J. J.; Warlow, Ben (2006) [1969]. Ships of the Royal Navy: The Complete Record of All Fighting Ships of the Royal Navy from the 15th Century to the Present (3rd Rev ed.). London: Chatham Publishing. ISBN 978-1-86176-281-8. OCLC 67375475.
- Dittmar, F.J.; Colledge, J.J. (1972). British Warships 1914–1919. Shepperton, UK: Ian Allan. ISBN 0-7110-0380-7.
- "The First Class Cruiser Grafton" (PDF). The Engineer. Vol. 75. 30 June 1893. pp. 563–564.
- Gardiner, Robert; Gray, Randal, eds. (1985). Conway's All The World's Fighting Ships 1906–1921. London: Conway Maritime Press. ISBN 0-85177-245-5.
- Gibbs, Charles (1900). The Cruise of HMS Grafton - a record of her commission on China Station, April 1896, to September 1899. London: Gale & Polden Ltd. OCLC 37279613.
- Gibson, R. H.; Maurice Prendergast (2003) [1931]. The German Submarine War, 1914–1918. Annapolis, Maryland: Naval Institute Press. ISBN 978-1-59114-314-7. OCLC 52924732.
- Jellicoe, John (1919). The Grand Fleet 1914–1916: Its Creation, Development and Work. London: Cassell and Company.
