= HMS M24 =

History

United Kingdom
- Name: HMS M24
- Builder: Sir Raylton Dixon & Co.
- Laid down: 1 March 1915
- Launched: 9 August 1915
- Fate: Sold 29 January 1920

General characteristics
- Class & type: M15 class monitor
- Displacement: 540 tons
- Length: 177 ft 3 in (54.03 m)
- Beam: 31 ft (9.4 m)
- Draught: 6 ft 9 in (2.06 m)
- Propulsion: 4 shaft; Campbell 4-cylinder paraffin engines; 640 hp
- Speed: 11 knots
- Complement: 69
- Armament: As built; 1 × BL 9.2-inch Mk VI gun; 1 × 12-pdr (76 mm) QF Mk 1 gun; 1 × 6 pdr (57 mm) QF MK 1 AA gun; 1918; 1 × BL 7.5-inch (190.5 mm) Mk III 50-caliber gun; 1 × QF 3-inch (76.20 mm) AA gun; 1 × 12-pdr (76 mm) QF Mk 1 gun; 2 × QF 2-pounder Mark II

HMS M24 was a First World War Royal Navy M15-class monitor. After service in the Dover Patrol, she was also served in the British intervention in Russia in 1919. She was sold in mercantile service in 1920.

== Design ==
Intended as a shore bombardment vessel, M24's primary armament was a single 9.2 inch Mk VI gun removed from the Edgar-class cruiser HMS Endymion. In addition to her 9.2-inch gun, she also possessed one 12 pounder and one six pound anti-aircraft gun. Due to the shortage of diesel engines, she was instead equipped with four-cylinder paraffin engines from the Campbell Gas Co. Producing 640 horsepower, these allowed a top speed of eleven knots. The monitor's crew consisted of sixty-nine officers and men.

HMS M24 ordered in March, 1915, as part of the War Emergency Programme of ship construction. She was laid down at the Sir Raylton Dixon & Co. Ltd shipyard at Govan in March 1915, launched on 9 August 1915, and completed in October 1915.

== Usage ==
=== World War 1 ===
M24 served in the Dover Patrol from October 1915 to June 1918. M24 had her main 9.2 in gun removed early in 1916, as it was required for artillery use on the Western Front, and a BL 7.5-inch (190.5 mm) Mk III 50-caliber gun was fitted in lieu.

=== Russia ===
M24 next saw service in support of the North Russian Expeditionary Force. Prior to departure, she had her two QF 2-pounder Mark II and her 12-pdr (76 mm) QF Mk 1 gun replaced by AA guns. She remained in the White Sea until September, 1919.

== Disposal ==
M24 was sold on 29 January 1920 for conversion to a mercantile oil tanker, and renamed Satoe.
