= HMS M22 =

1915 M15-class monitor

History

United Kingdom
- Name: HMS M22
- Builder: Sir Raylton Dixon & Co.
- Laid down: 1 March 1915
- Launched: 10 June 1915
- Fate: Sold December 1938 and wrecked 2 January 1939

General characteristics
- Class & type: M15-class monitor
- Displacement: 540 tons
- Length: 177 ft 3 in (54.03 m)
- Beam: 31 ft (9.4 m)
- Draught: 6 ft 9 in (2.06 m)
- Propulsion: 2 shaft; Triple Expansion steam engines; 650 ihp
- Speed: 11 knots
- Complement: 69
- Armament: As built; 1 × BL 9.2-inch Mk VI gun; 1 × 12-pdr (76 mm) QF Mk 1 gun; 1 × 6-pdr (57 mm) QF MK 1 AA gun; 1918; 1 × BL 9.2-inch Mk VI gun; 1 × QF 3-inch (76.20 mm) AA gun; 1 × 6-pdr (57 mm) QF MK 1 AA gun

HMS M22 was a First World War Royal Navy M15-class monitor. Later converted to a minelayer and renamed HMS Medea, she was wrecked whilst being towed for breaking up on 2 January 1939.

== Design ==
Intended as a shore bombardment vessel, M22's primary armament was a single 9.2 inch Mk VI gun removed from the Edgar-class cruiser HMS Gibraltar. In addition to her 9.2 inch gun she also possessed one 12 pounder and one six pound anti-aircraft gun. Due to the shortage of Bolinder diesel engines that equipped her sisters, she was fitted with 2 shaft triple expansion steam engines that allowed a top speed of eleven knots. The monitor's crew consisted of sixty nine officers and men.

== Construction ==
HMS M22 ordered in March, 1915, as part of the War Emergency Programme of ship construction. She was laid down at the Sir Raylton Dixon & Co. Ltd shipyard at Govan in March 1915, launched on 10 June 1915, and completed in August 1915.

== World War 1 ==
M22 served within the Mediterranean from September 1915 to December 1918.

== Interwar service ==
After service in the Black Sea from June to September 1919, M22 was towed home and converted to a minelayer in 1920. Renamed HMS Medea on 1 December 1925, she became a training ship in January 1937.
