= HMS M20 =

History

United Kingdom
- Name: HMS M20
- Builder: Sir Raylton Dixon & Co.
- Laid down: 1 March 1915
- Launched: 11 May 1915
- Fate: Sold 29 January 1920

General characteristics
- Class & type: M15 class monitor
- Displacement: 540 tons
- Length: 177 ft 3 in (54.03 m)
- Beam: 31 ft (9.4 m)
- Draught: 6 ft 9 in (2.06 m)
- Propulsion: 4-shaft; Bolinder 4-cylinder semi-diesel; 640 hp
- Speed: 11 knots
- Complement: 69
- Armament: As built; 1 × BL 9.2-inch Mk VI gun; 1 × 12-pdr (76 mm) QF Mk 1 gun; 1 × 6-pdr (57 mm) QF MK 1 AA gun; 1918; 1 × BL 9.2-inch Mk VI gun; 1 × QF 3-inch (76.20 mm) AA gun; 1 × 6-pdr (57 mm) QF MK 1 AA gun

HMS M20 was a First World War Royal Navy M15-class monitor.

== Design ==
Intended as a shore bombardment vessel, M20's primary armament was a single 9.2 inch Mk VI gun removed from the Edgar-class cruiser HMS Gibraltar. In addition to her 9.2-inch gun she also possessed one 12 pounder and one six-pound anti-aircraft gun. She was equipped with a four-shaft Bolinder two-cylinder semi-diesel engine with 640 horsepower that allowed a top speed of eleven knots. The monitor's crew consisted of sixty-nine officers and men.

== Construction ==
HMS M20 ordered in March, 1915, as part of the War Emergency Programme of ship construction. She was laid down at the Sir Raylton Dixon & Co. Ltd shipyard at Govan in March 1915, launched on 11 May 1915, and completed in July 1915.

== World War 1 ==
M20 served within the Mediterranean from August 1915 to December 1918. She did not return to Home Waters, paying off at Malta.

== Disposal ==
M20 was sold on 29 January 1920 for mercantile service as an oil tanker and renamed 'Lima'.
