= HMS M19 =

History

United Kingdom
- Name: HMS M19
- Builder: Sir Raylton Dixon & Co.
- Laid down: 1 March 1915
- Launched: 4 May 1915
- Fate: Sold 12 May 1920

General characteristics
- Class & type: M15 class monitor
- Displacement: 540 tons
- Length: 177 ft 3 in (54.03 m)
- Beam: 31 ft (9.4 m)
- Draught: 6 ft 9 in (2.06 m)
- Propulsion: 4-shaft; Bolinder 4-cylinder semi-diesel; 640 hp
- Speed: 11 knots
- Complement: 69
- Armament: As built; 1 × BL 9.2-inch Mk VI gun; 1 × 12-pdr (76 mm) QF Mk 1 gun; 1 × 6-pdr (57 mm) QF MK 1 AA gun; 1918; 1 × BL 9.2-inch Mk VI gun; 1 × QF 3-inch (76.20 mm) AA gun; 1 × 6-pdr (57 mm) QF MK 1 AA gun

HMS M19 was a First World War Royal Navy M15-class monitor.

== Design ==
Intended as a shore bombardment vessel, M19's primary armament was a single 9.2 inch Mk VI gun removed from the Edgar-class cruiser HMS Edgar. In addition to her 9.2-inch gun she also possessed one 12 pounder and one six pound anti-aircraft gun. She was equipped with a four shaft Bolinder two-cylinder semi-diesel engine with 640 horsepower that allowed a top speed of eleven knots. The monitor's crew consisted of sixty nine officers and men.

== Construction ==
HMS M19 ordered in March, 1915, as part of the War Emergency Programme of ship construction. She was laid down at the Sir Raylton Dixon & Co. Ltd shipyard at Govan in March 1915, launched on 4 May 1915, and completed in June 1915.

== World War 1 ==
M19 served within the Mediterranean from July 1915 to December 1915. On 4 December 1915, she was badly damaged by a gun explosion. She did not return to Home Waters, paying off at Mudros in 1919.

== Disposal ==
M19 was sold on 12 May 1920 for mercantile service as an oil tanker and renamed 'Delapan'.
