= HMS M33 =

M29-class monitor of the Royal Navy

Coordinates: 50°48′06.70″N 1°06′38.34″W

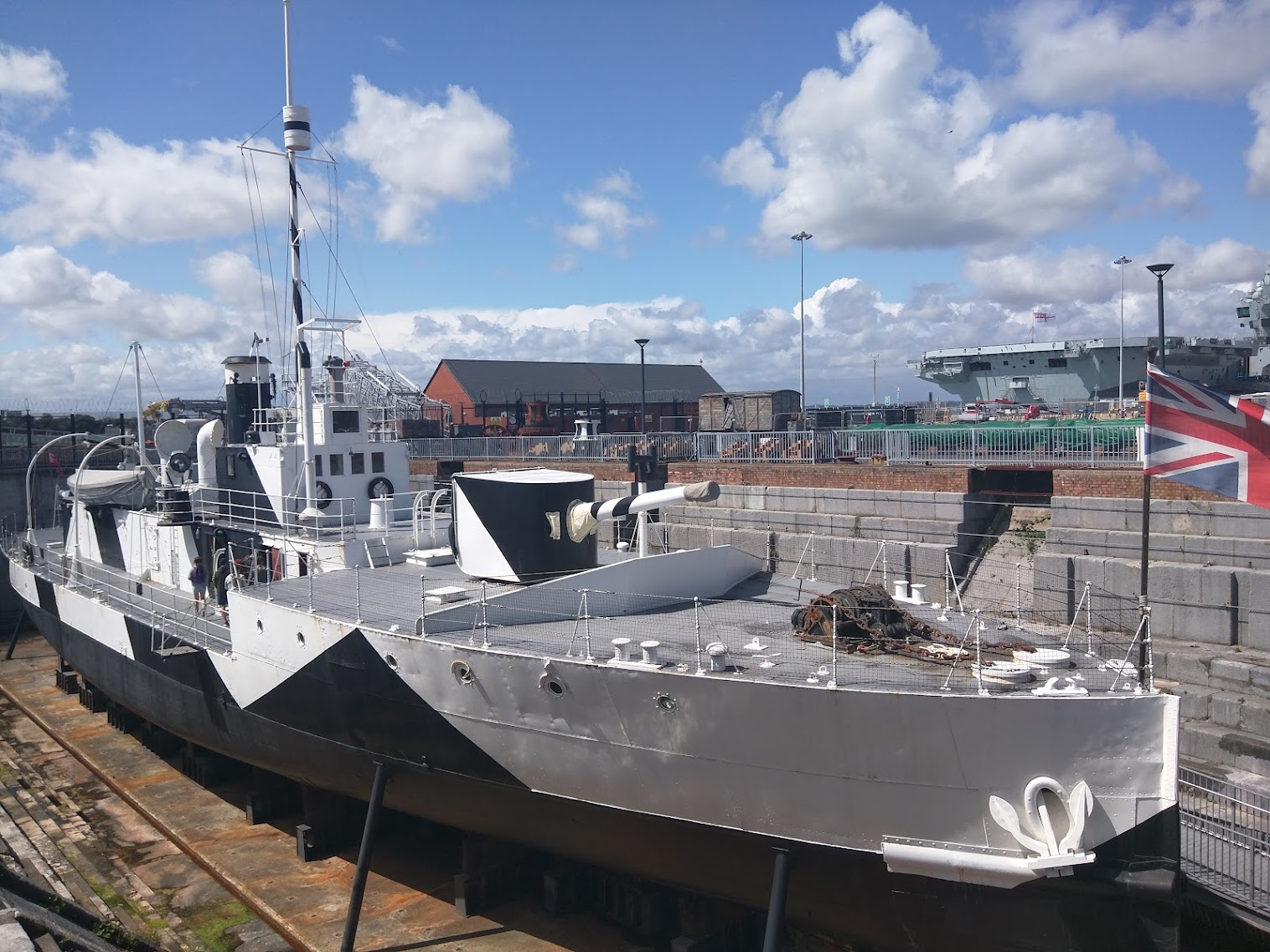
- M33 in Portsmouth Naval Dockyard, July 2021, restored into dazzle camouflage. HMS Prince of Wales is visible in the background.

History

United Kingdom
- Name: M33 (1915–1924); HMS Minerva (1925–1939); Hulk C23 (1939–1945); RMAS Minerva (1945–1997); HMS M33 (1997)
- Ordered: 15 March 1915
- Builder: Workman Clark, Belfast for Harland & Wolff
- Yard number: 489
- Launched: 22 May 1915
- Completed: 26 June 1915
- Commissioned: 24 June 1915
- Status: Museum ship, Portsmouth

General characteristics
- Class & type: M29-class monitor
- Displacement: 580 tons deep load
- Length: 177 ft 3 in (54.03 m)
- Beam: 31 ft (9.4 m)
- Draught: 5 ft 11 in (1.80 m)
- Installed power: 4,000 hp (2,980 kW)
- Propulsion: Triple-expansion steam engines; Twin screws
- Speed: 9.6 knots (18 km/h)
- Range: 1,440 nautical miles (2,670 km) at 8 knots (15 km/h)
- Complement: 72
- Armament: 2 × BL 6-inch (152 mm) Mk XII guns; 1 × QF 6-pounder (57 mm) gun; 2 × Maxim guns

HMS M33 is an M29-class monitor of the Royal Navy. Built in 1915, she saw active service in the Mediterranean during the First World War and in Russia during the Allied Intervention in 1919. She was used subsequently as a mine-laying training ship, fuelling hulk, boom defence workshop and floating office, being renamed HMS Minerva and Hulk C23 during her long life. She passed to Hampshire County Council in the 1980s and was then handed over to the National Museum of the Royal Navy in 2014. A programme of conservation was undertaken to enable her to be opened to the public. HMS M33 is located within Portsmouth Historic Dockyard and opened to visitors on 7 August 2015 following a service of dedication. She is one of only two surviving Royal Navy warships of the First World War and the only surviving Allied ship that took part in the Gallipoli Campaign.

== Construction ==
M33 was built as part of the rapid ship construction campaign following the outbreak of the First World War by Harland & Wolff, Belfast. The design of the M29-class monitors were provided by Assistant Constructor Charles Lillicrap for a simple plan for five monitors to carry two guns, as a modified design from the M15-class monitor.

This re-design was to accommodate the 6-inch Mk XII guns deemed surplus from the aft casemates of the Queen Elizabeth-class battleship, and oil tanks required for her boilers. Her simple design allowed for pre-fabrication of her structure, allowing shipbuilder Workman Clark to build two ships of the class in tandem, M32 and M33 were built together.

Her keel was laid down in March 1915, she was launched in May and commissioned in June; an impressive shipbuilding feat, especially considering that numerous other ships of her type were being built in the same period.

== First World War ==
Armed with a pair of 6-inch (152 mm) guns and having a shallow draught, M33 was designed for coastal bombardment. Commanded by Lieutenant Commander Preston-Thomas, her first active operation was the support of the British landings at Suvla during the Battle of Gallipoli in August 1915.

She remained stationed at Gallipoli until the evacuation in January 1916, sustaining no damage from enemy fire, referred to as a 'lucky ship' by the crew. For the remainder of the war she served in the Mediterranean and was involved in the seizure of the Greek fleet at Salamis Bay on 1 September 1916.

M33 remained in the Mediterranean for the remainder of the First World War, actively patrolling the Aegean Sea, predominately around Lesbos. She returned to the UK after the end of the First World War.

== Russian Intervention ==
M33 next saw service, along with five other monitors (M23, M25, M27, M31 and Humber), which were sent to Murmansk in 1919 to relieve the North Russian Expeditionary Force. In June, M33 moved to Archangel and her shallow draught enabled her to travel up the Dvina River to cover the withdrawal of British and White Russian forces.

During a patrol in August 1919 M33 came under fire from Bolshevik forces, during the engagement at close range an artillery shell penetrated the starboard hull just above the waterline and landed in the aft end of the engine room without exploding. The entry damage and the repair patch applied afterwards remain visible on M33 today.

At one time the river level was so low the ship's guns had to be removed and transported by cart, with the crew placing as much weight on her stern to keep the propellers in the water and to push M33 over the mudbanks. M25 and M27 were not so fortunate and had to be scuttled on 16 September 1919 after running aground. M33 safely returned to Chatham in October 1919.

== Harbour service and restoration ==
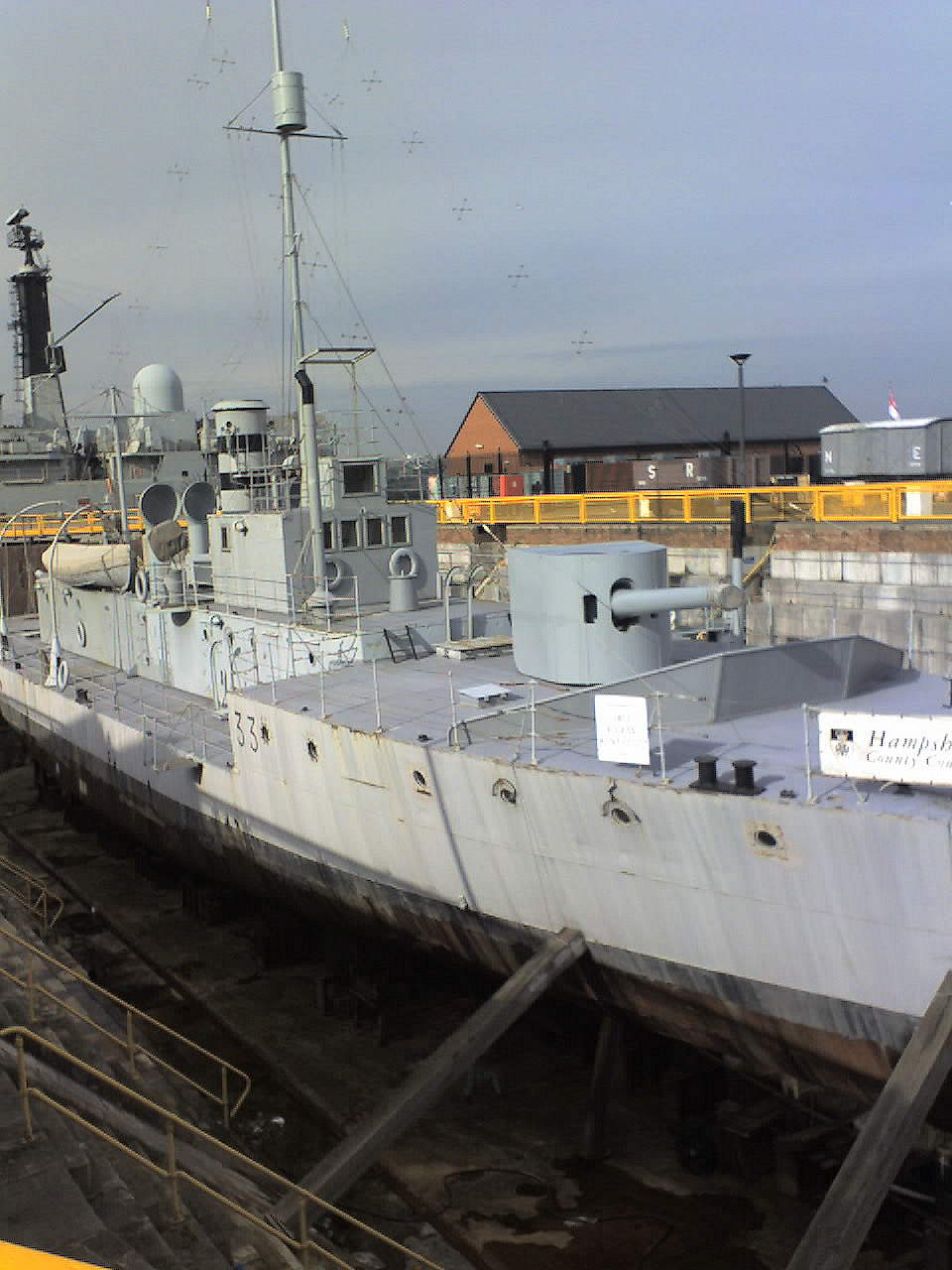
M33 during restoration in February 2007

In 1925 M33 became a mine-laying training ship and was renamed HMS Minerva on 3 February 1925. She went through a number of roles for the remainder of her career including fuelling hulk and boom defence workshop. Her name was changed again in 1939, this time to Hulk C23. In 1946 she became a floating office at the Royal Clarence Victualling Yard at Gosport.

Put up for sale in 1984, in July 1987 she left Portsmouth on the barge Pacific Goliath alongside HMS Trincomalee; that ship had been placed on a cradle to support her wooden hull, but M.33 with her flat bottom could be placed on the barge instead. In Hartlepool early restoration work was undertaken including painting her back to wartime colours and restoration of her superstructure. She later passed to Hampshire County Council and was towed back to Portsmouth to begin further restoration, she was moored in No.1 Basin near HMS Victory.

HMS M.33 is listed as part of the National Historic Fleet, she is now located at Portsmouth Historic Dockyard, close to HMS Victory. She was opened to the public for the first time as part of the National Museum of the Royal Navy on 7 August 2015. M33 is one of only three surviving British warships that served during the First World War, the others being HMS Caroline and HMS President, although a number of auxiliary vessels and small craft have also survived.

== Bibliography ==
- Schleihauf, William (2000). "The Restoration of HMS M-33". Warship International. XXXVII (2): 170–176.
- Sheldon, Matthew (2015). HMS M.33. Stroud, Gloucestershire: The History Press. ISBN 9781841656618.
