= HMS M23 =

History

United Kingdom
- Name: HMS M23
- Builder: Sir Raylton Dixon & Co.
- Laid down: 1 March 1915
- Launched: 17 June 1915
- Fate: Broken Up 1959

General characteristics
- Class & type: M15 class monitor
- Displacement: 540 tons
- Length: 177 ft 3 in (54.03 m)
- Beam: 31 ft (9.4 m)
- Draught: 6 ft 9 in (2.06 m)
- Propulsion: 4-shaft; Bolinder 4-cylinder semi-diesel; 640 hp
- Speed: 11 knots
- Complement: 69
- Armament: As built; 1 × BL 9.2 inch Mk VI gun; 1 × 12-pdr (76 mm) QF Mk 1 gun; 1 × 6-pdr (57 mm) QF MK 1 AA gun; 1918; 1 × BL 7.5-inch (190.5 mm) Mk III 50-caliber gun; 1 × QF 3-inch (76.20 mm) AA gun; 1 × 12-pdr (76 mm) QF Mk 1 gun; 2 × QF 2-pounder Mark II

HMS M23 was a First World War Royal Navy M15-class monitor. After service in the Mediterranean and the Dover Patrol, she was also served in the British intervention in Russia in 1919. Converted to the RNVR drillship Claverhouse in 1922, she served in that capacity at "Leith" until 1958.

== Design ==
Intended as a shore bombardment vessel, M23's primary armament was a single 9.2 inch Mk VI gun removed from the Edgar-class cruiser HMS Grafton. In addition to her 9.2-inch gun, she also possessed one 12 pounder and one six pound anti-aircraft gun. She was equipped with a four-shaft Bolinder four-cylinder semi-diesel engine with 640 horsepower that allowed a top speed of eleven knots. The monitor's crew consisted of sixty-nine officers and men.

== Construction ==
HMS M23 ordered in March, 1915, as part of the War Emergency Programme of ship construction. She was laid down at the Sir Raylton Dixon & Co. Ltd shipyard at Govan in March 1915, launched on 17 June 1915, and completed in July 1915.

== World War 1 ==
M23 served initially in the Mediterranean from October 1915. On her return from the Mediterranean in May 1917, M23 had her main 9.2 in gun removed, as it was required for artillery use on the Western Front, and a BL 7.5-inch (190.5 mm) Mk III 50-caliber gun was fitted in lieu.

M23 then served with the Dover Patrol from June 1917 to June 1918.

== Russia ==
M23 next saw service in support of the North Russian Expeditionary Force. Prior to departure, she had her two QF 2-pounder Mark II and her 12-pdr (76 mm) QF Mk 1 gun replaced by AA guns.

== RNVR Claverhouse ==
M23 returned to Sheerness in November 1919. In August 1922 she moved to Dundee, where she became a Royal Naval Volunteer Reserve (RNVR) drillship, and was renamed Claverhouse on 16 December 1922. She served in this capacity until sold in 1959. She arrived at Charlestown, Fife on 21 April 1959 for breaking up.
