= M15-class monitor =

1915 class of British warships

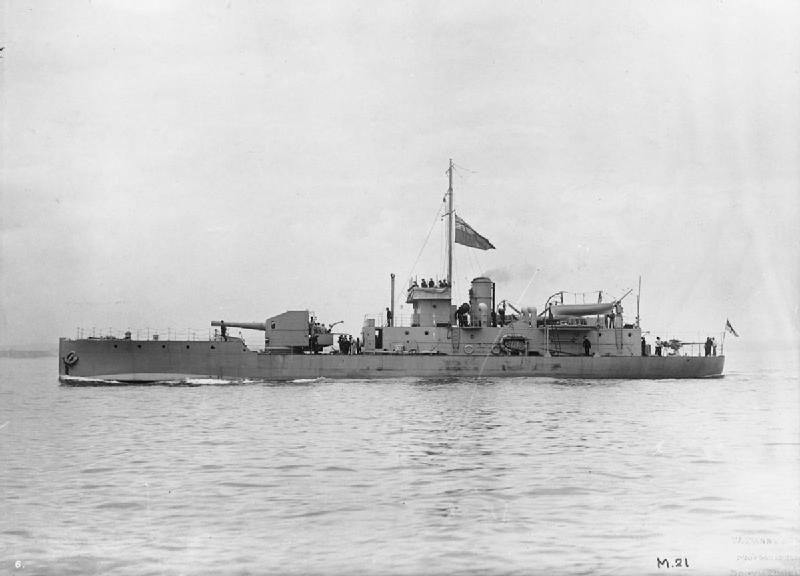
- HMS M21

Class overview
- Name: M15 class
- Builders: William Gray (10); Sir Raylton Dixon (4)
- Operators: Royal Navy
- Preceded by: Gorgon class
- Succeeded by: M29 class
- In service: 1915–1959
- Completed: 14
- Lost: 3

General characteristics
- Type: Monitor
- Displacement: 540 tons
- Length: 177 ft 3 in (54.03 m)
- Beam: 31 ft (9.4 m)
- Draught: 6 ft 9 in (2.06 m)
- Propulsion: 2 shafts; Triple-expansion; 800 hp (600 kW); 4 shaft; Bolinder 4-cylinder semi-diesel; 640 hp (480 kW); 4 shafts; Campbell 4-cylinder paraffin engines; 560 bhp (420 kW)
- Speed: 11 knots (20 km/h; 13 mph)
- Complement: 69
- Armament: 1 × BL 9.2-inch (233.7 mm) Mk X gun (M15-M18) or BL 9.2-inch Mk VI gun; 1 × 12-pdr (76mm) QF Mk 1 gun; 1 v 6-pdr (57mm) QF MK 1 AA gun

The M15 class comprised fourteen monitors of the Royal Navy, all built and launched during 1915.

== Design ==
The ships of this class were ordered in March, 1915, as part of the Emergency War Programme of ship construction. They were designed to use the 9.2 inch Mk VI gun turrets removed from the Edgar class and the Mk X turrets held in stock for the Drake-class and Cressy-class cruisers. This resulted in the first four of the class, which were built by William Gray & Company of Hartlepool, receiving the Mk X mounting. The remaining ten ships, all built by Sir Raylton Dixon & Co., Middlesbrough, all received the Mk VI mounting.

During September 1915, the 9.2 inch guns of HMS M24, M25, M26 and M27 were removed for use as artillery. These were replaced by 7.5-inch guns. M24 and M25 received the spare guns reserved for the recently sunk pre-dreadnought battleship Triumph, M26 received one of Swiftsure's spare guns. M27 received 6-inch (M27) guns.

M21 and M23 also had their 9.2-inch gun removed in 1917, receiving 7.5-inch guns from the decommissioned pre-dreadnought Swiftsure.

The class used a mixture of propulsion methods. M21 and M22 were fitted with conventional triple-expansion steam engines, M24 was fitted with four-cylinder paraffin engines, and the remainder received Bolinder four-cylinder semi-diesel engines.

Admiral Reginald Bacon, who had commanded several of the M15 class in the Dover Patrol, wrote about his experiences with the ships of the patrol in 1919. While generally positive about the performance of the design, he noted that they had a tendency to roll, using a specific occasion with M25 as an example;

"The M25, while in the mouth of the Thames at anchor, rolled 180 degrees in ten seconds - that is, she made two complete rolls of 45 degrees each way, each occupying only five seconds."

== Service ==
M25, M26, M27 and M28 served in the Dover Patrol from 1915 to 1918. The remainder served in the Mediterranean from 1915, with M23 joining the Dover Patrol in June 1917 and M21 in October 1917.

As part of the intervention into the Russian civil war M23, M24, M25 and M27 served in support of British and White Russian forces in the White Sea in May to September 1919.

M22 was converted to a minelayer in 1920, whilst M23 became a drill ship, surviving until 1959.

== Ships of the class ==
- M15 - launched on 28 April 1915 and sunk by UC-38 on 11 November 1917.
- M16 - launched on 3 May 1915 and sold 29 January 1920.
- M17 - launched on 12 May 1915 and sold 12 May 1920.
- M18 - launched on 15 May 1915 and sold 29 January 1920.
- M19 - launched on 4 May 1915 and sold 12 May 1920.
- M20 - launched on 11 May 1915 and sold 29 January 1920.
- M21 - launched on 27 May 1915 and mined 20 October 1918.
- M22 - launched on 10 June 1915, renamed Medea 1925 and sold December 1938
- M23 - launched on 17 June 1915, renamed Claverhouse 1922 and sold 1959
- M24 - launched on 9 August 1915 and sold 29 January 1920.
- M25 - launched on 24 July 1915 and scuttled 16 September 1919
- M26 - launched on 24 August 1915 and sold 29 January 1920.
- M27 - launched on 8 September 1915 and scuttled 16 September 1919
- M28 - launched on 28 June 1915 and sunk during the Battle of Imbros 20 January 1918

== Bibliography ==
- Bacon, Reginald (1919). The Dover Patrol 1915-1917. (2 vols.). New York: George H. Doran Co. Vol. 1 • Vol. 2
- Buxton, Ian (2008) [1978]. Big Gun Monitors: Design, Construction and Operations 1914–1945 (2nd Revised ed.). Barnsley, UK: Seaforth Publishing. ISBN 978-1-84415-719-8.
- Crossley, Jim (2013). Monitors of the Royal Navy; How the Fleet Brought the Great Guns to Bear. Barnsley, UK: Pen & Sword. ISBN 978-1-78383-004-6.
- Dittmar, F. J. & Colledge, J. J., "British Warships 1914-1919", (Ian Allan, London, 1972), ISBN 0-7110-0380-7
- Dunn, Steve R (2017). Securing the Narrow Sea: The Dover Patrol 1914–1918. Barnsley, UK: Seaforth Publishing. ISBN 978-1-84832-251-6.
- Friedman, Norman (2011). Naval Weapons of World War One: Guns, Torpedoes, Mines and ASW Weapons of All Nations; An Illustrated Directory. Barnsley: Seaforth Publishing. ISBN 978-1-84832-100-7.
- Gray, Randal (ed), "Conway's All the World's Fighting Ships 1906–1921", (Conway Maritime Press, London, 1985), ISBN 0-85177-245-5
- Parkes, Oscar; Prendergast, Maurice, eds. (1969) [First published 1919]. Jane's Fighting Ships 1919. New York: Arco Publishing Co. ISBN 978-0-71534-716-4. OCLC 1902851.
