= Clive MacDonnell Dixon =

English illustrator and soldier

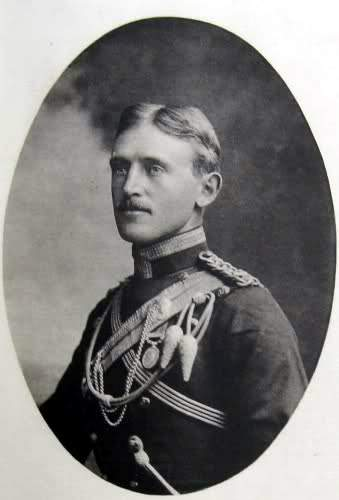
- Born: 10 February 1870; Middlesbrough, England
- Died: 5 November 1914 (aged 44); Ypres salient, Belgium
- Cause of death: Killed in action
- Known for: His book "The Leaguer of Ladysmith"
- Scientific career
- Workplaces: 16th Lancers

Major Clive MacDonnell Dixon (10 February 1870 in Middlesbrough – 5 November 1914 in Ypres) was an English illustrator and soldier, best known for the charming images in his book The Leaguer of Ladysmith, created during the four-month Siege of Ladysmith in South Africa. This material also appeared in the Ladysmith Lyre at the time of the siege. The Sphere praised the book, describing it as 'highly humorous and showing comic sketching genius'.

== Background ==
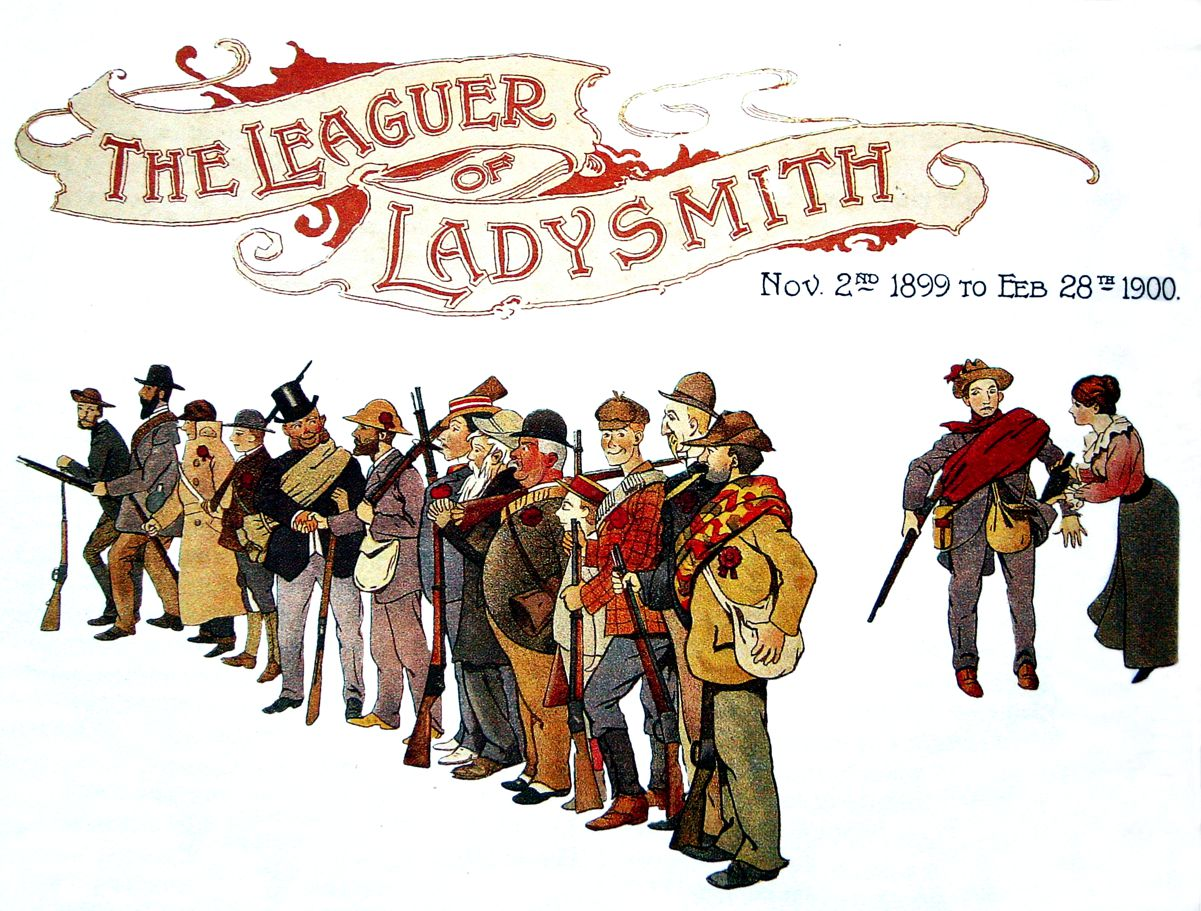

Dixon was the fifth-born in a family of 6 daughters and 2 sons of Sir Raylton Dixon (1838–1901), shipbuilder from Cleveland Dockyard, Middlesbrough-on-Tees, mayor of Middlesbrough in 1889, himself an amateur artist and caricaturist, and great, great grandson of George Dixon and great great nephew of Jeremiah Dixon.

== Career ==
Dixon attended Rugby School and Sandhurst before embarking on a military career when he was commissioned a second lieutenant in the 16th Lancers on 8 October 1890. He was promoted to lieutenant on 27 January 1893, and to captain on 28 January 1899. During the early part of the Second Boer War 1899-1900 he was aide-de-camp to Sir George White. He was appointed adjutant to his regiment on 22 March 1900, and served as such for the rest of the war, during which he was promoted a brevet major on 29 November 1900. Dixon resigned from the army in August 1902 following the end of the war, and returned home on the SS Scot in September 1902. He re-enlisted after the outbreak of the First World War, and was killed at the First Battle of Ypres shortly after receiving the substantive promotion to Major.

== Family ==
Dixon married Lilian Margaret Bell daughter of John Bell of Rushpool Hall, with whom he had three sons, Raylton, John and William and three daughters Margaret, Elizabeth and Barbara. He was buried in the Nieuwkerke Churchyard in Belgium.

Several watercolours by Dixon are kept by the Africana Museum.
