= HMS M16 =

History

United Kingdom
- Name: HMS M16
- Builder: William Gray, Hartlepool.
- Laid down: 1 March 1915
- Launched: 3 May 1915
- Fate: Sold 29 January 1920

General characteristics
- Class & type: M15-class monitor
- Displacement: 540 tons
- Length: 177 ft 3 in (54.03 m)
- Beam: 31 ft (9.4 m)
- Draught: 6 ft 9 in (2.06 m)
- Propulsion: 2 shaft; Triple expansion steam engines; 800 hp (600 kW)
- Speed: 11 knots (20 km/h)
- Complement: 69
- Armament: As built; 1 × BL 9.2-inch Mk X gun; 1 × 12-pdr (76 mm) QF Mk 1 gun; 1 × 6-pdr (57 mm) QF MK 1 AA gun; 1918; 1 × BL 9.2-inch Mk X gun; 1 × QF 3-inch (76.20 mm) AA gun

HMS M16 was a First World War Royal Navy M15-class monitor.

== Design ==
Originally intended as a shore bombardment vessel, M16's primary armament was a single 9.2 inch Mk X gun which had been held as a spare for the Drake-class cruiser and Cressy-class cruiser. In addition to her 9.2 inch gun, she also possessed one 12 pounder and one six pound anti-aircraft gun. She was equipped with Triple Expansion steam engines rated to 800 horse power that allowed a top speed of eleven knots. The monitor's crew consisted of sixty nine officers and men.

== Construction ==
HMS M16 was ordered in March, 1915, as part of the War Emergency Programme of ship construction. She was laid down at the William Gray shipyard at Hartlepool in March 1915, launched on 3 May 1915, and completed in June 1915.

== World War 1 ==
M16 served in the Mediterranean from July 1915 to October 1918.

== Disposal ==
M16 was sold on 29 January 1920 for mercantile service as an oil tanker with Anglo Saxon Petroleum Co, and renamed 'Tiga'.
