= HMS M18 =

History

United Kingdom
- Name: M18
- Builder: William Gray, Hartlepool
- Laid down: 1 March 1915
- Launched: 15 May 1915
- Fate: Sold, 29 January 1920

General characteristics (as built)
- Class & type: M15 class monitor
- Displacement: 540 long tons (550 t)
- Length: 177 ft 3 in (54.03 m)
- Beam: 31 ft (9.4 m)
- Draught: 6 ft 9 in (2.06 m)
- Installed power: 640 bhp (480 kW)
- Propulsion: 4 shaft; Bolinder semi-diesel
- Speed: 11 knots (20 km/h; 13 mph)
- Complement: 69
- Armament: 1 × 9.2 in (230 mm) gun; 1 × 12 pdr (3 in(76 mm)) gun; 1 × 6 pdr (57 mm) AA gun

HMS M18 was a M15-class monitor built for the Royal Navy during the First World War.

== Design ==
Intended as a shore bombardment vessel, M18's primary armament was a single 9.2 inch Mk X gun which had been held as a spare for the Drake-class cruiser and Cressy-class cruiser. In addition to her 9.2-inch gun, she also possessed one 12 pounder and one six pound anti-aircraft gun. She was equipped with a four-shaft Bolinder two-cylinder semi-diesel engine with 640 horsepower that allowed a top speed of eleven knots. The monitor's crew consisted of sixty-nine officers and men.

== Construction ==
HMS M18 ordered in March, 1915, as part of the War Emergency Programme of ship construction. She was laid down at the William Gray shipyard at Hartlepool in March 1915, launched on 15 May 1915, and completed in July 1915.

== World War 1 ==
M18 served in the Mediterranean from October 1915 to October 1918, and in the Baltic April to June 1919.

== Disposal ==
M18 was sold on 29 January 1920 for mercantile service as an oil tanker and renamed 'Anam'. She was renamed 'Alcione C.' in 1926 and was eventually torpedoed by the British submarine Taurus on 14 March 1944.
