= HMS M17 =

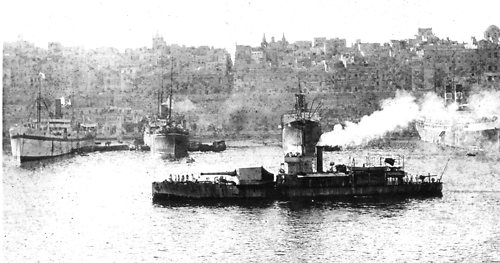
- HMS M17, before 1920

History

United Kingdom
- Name: HMS M17
- Builder: William Gray, Hartlepool
- Laid down: 1 March 1915
- Launched: 12 May 1915
- Fate: Sold 12 May 1920

General characteristics
- Class & type: M15 class monitor
- Displacement: 540 tons
- Length: 177 ft 3 in (54.03 m)
- Beam: 31 ft (9.4 m)
- Draught: 6 ft 9 in (2.06 m)
- Propulsion: 2 shaft; Triple Expansion steam engines; 800 hp
- Speed: 11 knots (20 km/h)
- Complement: 69
- Armament: As built; 1 × BL 9.2-inch Mk X gun; 1 × 12-pdr (76 mm) QF Mk 1 gun; 1 × 6-pdr (57 mm) QF MK 1 AA gun

HMS M17 was a First World War Royal Navy M15-class monitor.

== Design ==
Intended as a shore bombardment vessel, M17's primary armament was a single 9.2 inch Mk X gun which had been held as a spare for the Drake-class cruiser and Cressy-class cruiser. In addition to her 9.2 inch gun, she also possessed one 12 pounder and one six pound anti-aircraft gun. She was equipped with Triple Expansion steam engines rated to 800 horse power that allowed a top speed of eleven knots. The monitor's crew consisted of sixty nine officers and men.

== Construction ==
HMS M17 was ordered in March 1915, as part of the War Emergency Programme of ship construction. She was laid down at the William Gray shipyard at Hartlepool in March 1915, launched on 12 May 1915, and completed in July 1915.

== World War 1 ==
M17 served in the Mediterranean from August 1915 to October 1918, and in the Baltic from March to September 1919.

== Disposal ==
M17 was sold on 12 May 1920 for mercantile service as an oil tanker and renamed 'Todejoe'.

== Sources ==
- Colledge, J. J.; Warlow, Ben (2006) [1969]. Ships of the Royal Navy: The Complete Record of All Fighting Ships of the Royal Navy from the 15th Century to the Present (3rd Rev ed.). London: Chatham Publishing. ISBN 978-1-86176-281-8. OCLC 67375475.
- Dittmar, F. J. & Colledge, J. J., "British Warships 1914-1919", (Ian Allan, London, 1972), ISBN 0-7110-0380-7
