= HMS Theseus (1892) =

1896 Edgar-class protected cruiser of the Royal Navy

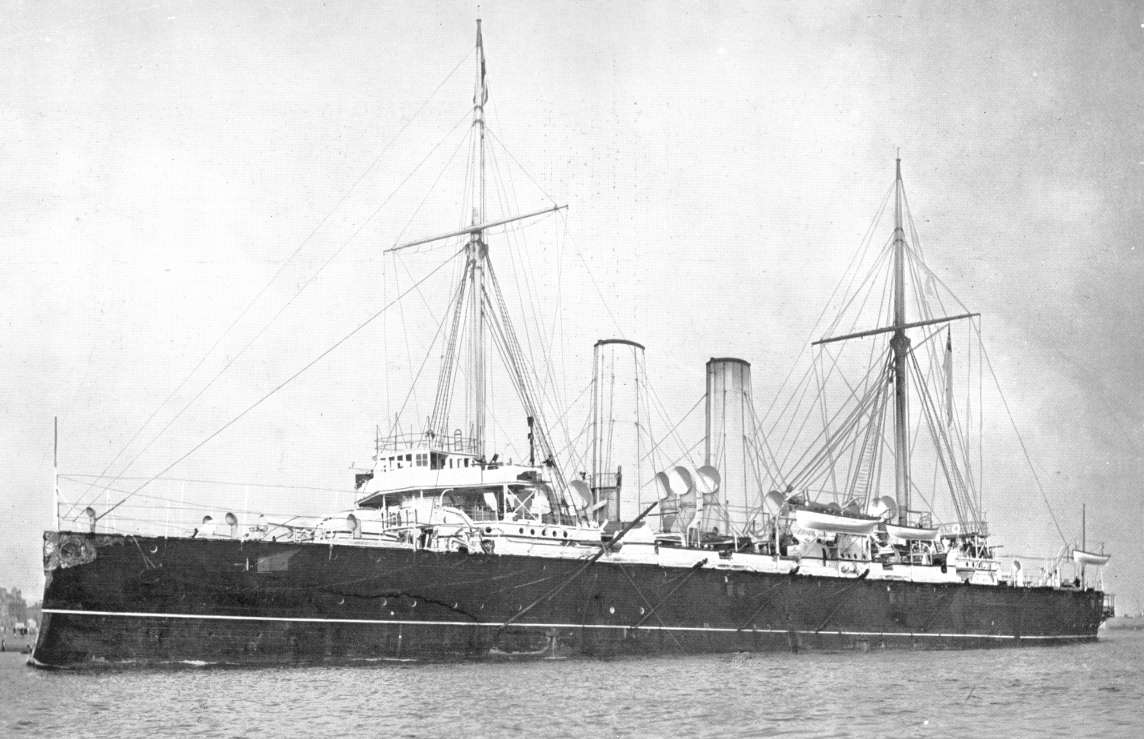

History

United Kingdom
- Name: HMS Theseus
- Namesake: Theseus
- Builder: Thames Ironworks and Shipbuilding Company
- Laid down: 16 July 1890
- Launched: 8 September 1892
- Commissioned: 14 January 1896
- Fate: Sold for breaking up 8 November 1921

General characteristics
- Class & type: Edgar-class cruiser
- Displacement: 7,350 tons
- Length: 387.5 ft (118.1 m)
- Beam: 60 ft (18 m)
- Draught: 23 ft (7.0 m)
- Propulsion: Four boilers, two cylinder vertical triple expansion engines, two shafts 12,000 horsepower (8,900 kW)
- Speed: 20 knots (37 km/h)
- Range: 10,000 nautical miles (19,000 km) at 10 knots (19 km/h)
- Complement: 544
- Armament: 2 × BL 9.2-inch (234 mm) guns; 10 × QF 6-inch (152 mm) guns; 12 × 6-pounder (57 mm) guns; 5 × 3-pounder (47 mm) guns; 4 × 18-inch (450 mm) torpedo submerged tubes

HMS Theseus was an Edgar-class protected cruiser of the Royal Navy. The Edgars were similar but smaller versions of the Blake class. Theseus was launched at Leamouth, London in 1892 and commissioned on 14 January 1896.

== Service history ==
Illustration of Theseus shelling Turkish positions in 1915

Upon commission in 1896, Theseus was part of the Special Flying Squadron, which had been formed in response to a war scare with Germany, following which she was posted to the Mediterranean Fleet.

In January 1897 Theseus was ordered from the Mediterranean to join Rear Admiral Sir Harry Rawson's fleet that had been sent to West Africa for a punitive expedition against Benin. The force was assembled off the coast of Benin by 3 February, with landings taking place on 9 February. Benin City was captured on 18 February and the force re-embarked on the ships of the fleet on 27 February. The ship's crew suffered badly from Malaria as a result of her service during the Benin expedition, and when Theseus was refitted at Chatham later that year she required a thorough disinfection.

She served in the Mediterranean until late April 1902, when she left Malta homebound to pay off, arriving at Plymouth on 6 May, and Chatham three days later. She was paid off into the Medway Fleet Reserve on 28 May 1902.

She was a tender ship to Cambridge from 1905 to 1913. In February 1913, Theseus joined the Queenstown Training Squadron.

When war broke out in 1914, Theseus joined the 10th Cruiser Squadron. In late August Russian forces in the Baltic captured copies of the German Navy codebook and Theseus was dispatched from Scapa Flow to Alexandrovosk in order to collect the copies offered to the British. Although she arrived on 7 September, due to mixups she did not depart until 30 September and returned to Scapa with two Russian couriers and the documents on 10 October. The books were formally handed over to the First Lord, Winston Churchill, on 13 October, and subsequently exploited by the cryptanalysts of Room 40.

Theseus rejoined 10th Cruiser Squadron, which on 15 October was on patrol off Aberdeen, deployed in line abreast at intervals of about 10 nautical miles (19 kilometres). Theseus was unsuccessfully attacked by the German submarine U-17. The flotilla was ordered to proceed at full speed to the northwest in response to this attack, but no response to the order was heard from Theseus's sister ship Hawke. Hawke had been torpedoed by the German submarine U-9 several hours earlier and had quickly capsized and sank out of sight of the rest of the flotilla. Only 70 of Hawke's 594 crew survived.

Theseus was rearmed, along with bulges to her hull, which were added to enable her to take part in the Dardanelles Campaign. In 1916 she was deployed to the Mediterranean and was then sent to the White Sea. In 1918 she was sent to the Aegean Sea to become a depot ship. In 1919, Theseus had her final deployment, when she was sent to the Black Sea. She returned to the UK in 1920 and was scrapped the following year in Germany.

== Sources ==
- Beesly, Patrick (1982). Room 40: British Naval Intelligence, 1914–1918. Long Acre, London: Hamish Hamilton Ltd. ISBN 0-241-10864-0.
- Colledge, J. J.; Warlow, Ben (2006) [1969]. Ships of the Royal Navy: The Complete Record of All Fighting Ships of the Royal Navy from the 15th Century to the Present (3rd Rev ed.). London: Chatham Publishing. ISBN 978-1-86176-281-8. OCLC 67375475.
- Roger Chesneau and Eugene M. Kolesnik, ed., Conway's All the World's Fighting Ships 1860–1905, (Conway Maritime Press, London, 1979), ISBN 0-85177-133-5
- Clowes, William Laird (1903). The Royal Navy: A History from the Earliest Times to the Death of Queen Victoria. Vol. VII. London: Sampson Low, Marston and Company Ltd.
- "Engines of H.M.S. Theseus and Royal Arthur" (PDF). The Engineer. Vol. 77. 23 March 1894. p. 249.
- Massie, Robert K. (2007). Castles of Steel: Britain, Germany and the Winning of the Great War at Sea. London: Vintage Books. ISBN 978-0-099-52378-9.
- Monograph No. 19: Tenth Cruiser Squadron I (PDF). Naval Staff Monographs (Historical). Vol. VII. The Naval Staff, Training and Staff Duties Division. 1922. pp. 5–66.
- "Trials of H.M.S. Theseus" (PDF). The Engineer. Vol. 76. 22 December 1893. p. 596.
