= BL 7.5-inch Mk II – V naval gun =

Ordnance BL 7.5-inch Mk II–Mk V guns
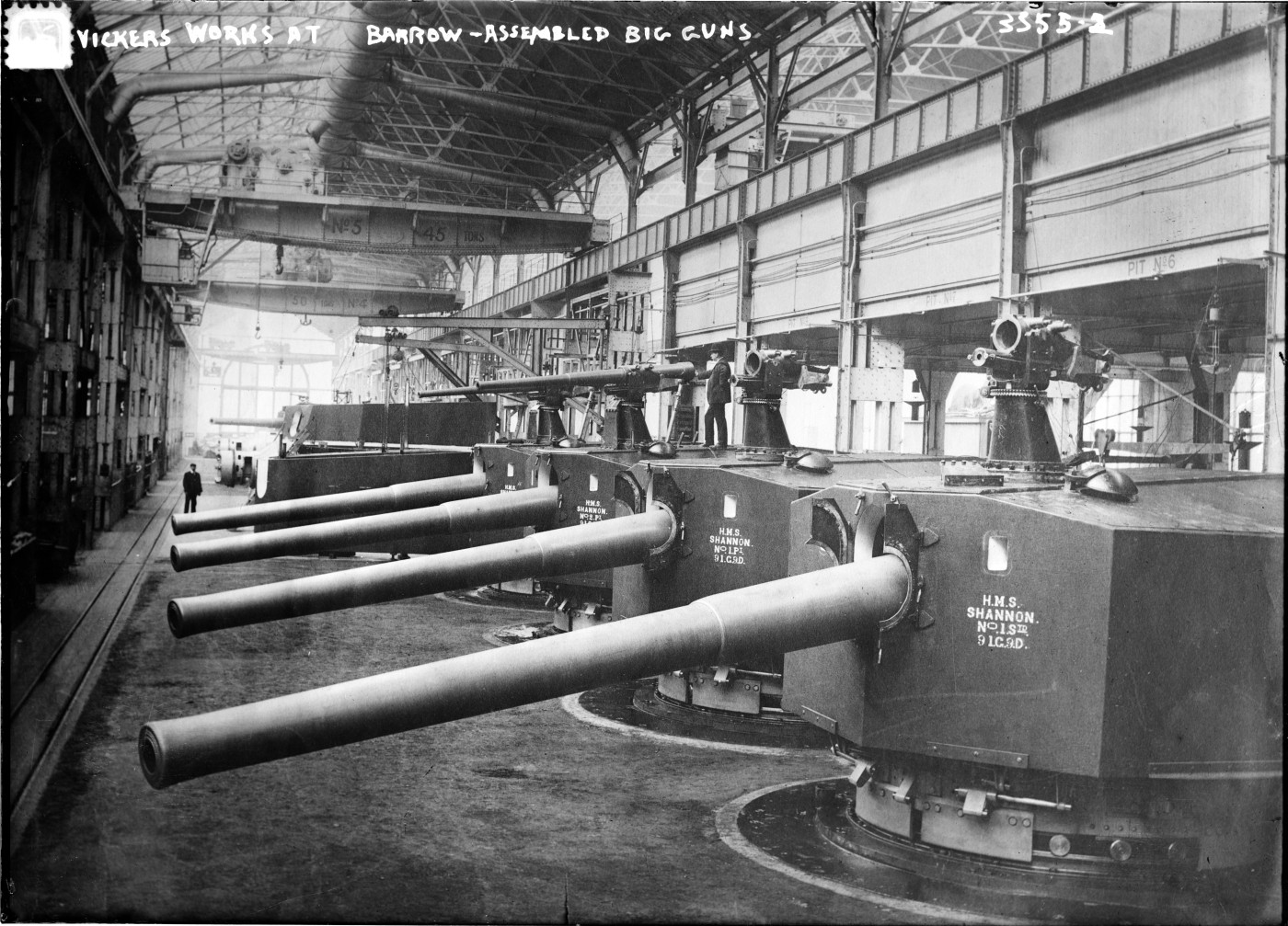
- Turrets for HMS Shannon under construction at the Vickers Works, Barrow
- Type: Naval gun Coast defence gun
- Place of origin: United Kingdom

Service history
- In service: 1905–20
- Used by: Royal Navy; British India
- Wars: World War I

Production history
- Variants: Mks II, II*, II**, III, IV, V

Specifications
- Mass: 14½ - 16 tons barrel & breech
- Barrel length: 375 inches (9,520 mm); (50 calibre)
- Shell: 200 pounds (90.7 kg)
- Calibre: 7.5 inches (191 mm)
- Muzzle velocity: 2,765 to 2,840 feet per second (843 to 866 m/s)
- Maximum firing range: 14,200 yards (13,000 m)

The BL 7.5-inch Mk II–Mk V guns (Note: Britain used Roman numerals to designate versions or models ("Mark" abbreviated as "Mk") until after World War II. Hence this articles covers the second through fifth model/version/Mark of British BL 7.5-inch naval guns) were a variety of 50-calibre naval guns used by Britain in World War I. They all had similar performance and fired the same shells.

== History ==
=== Mark II ===
Mark II guns were originally developed to suit India's coastal defence requirements. During World War I several reserve guns made for India but still in the UK were employed as coastal defence guns in the UK. They were scrapped or sent to India soon after the war.

=== Marks II*, II**, V ===
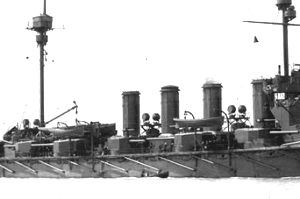
Starboard secondary Mk V battery on HMS Minotaur

These were built and employed specifically as naval guns and were mounted as secondary armament as a heavier alternative to 6-inch guns, on the following ships :

- Warrior-class armoured cruisers laid down 1903–04, commissioned 1906–07
- Minotaur-class armoured cruisers laid down 1905, commissioned 1908–09

=== Mark III ===
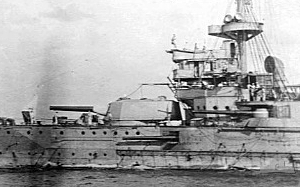
Forward port Mk III casemate guns on Swiftsure, Gallipoli 1915

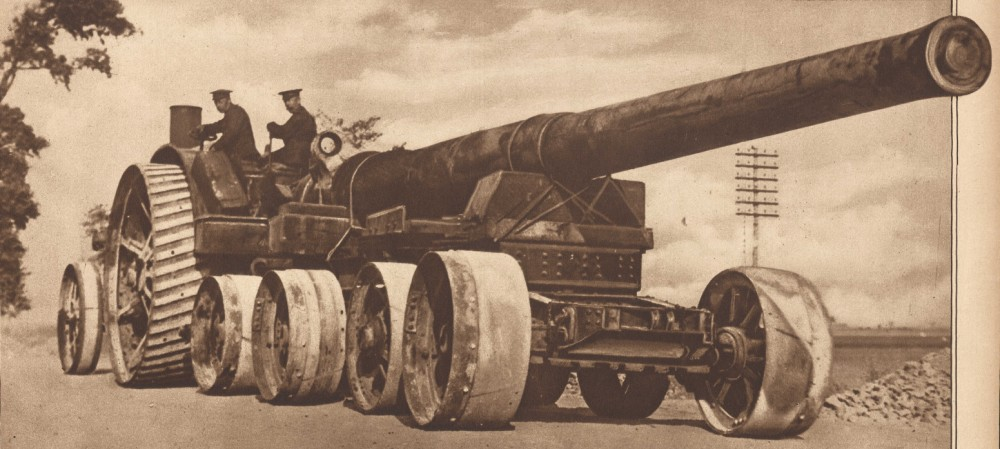
Mk III gun from Swiftsure being transported in Belgium in 1917. Photo by Ernest Brooks

Mark III guns were built by Elswick Ordnance to arm the battleship Constitución they were building for Chile. Britain acquired them by default when she bought Constitución in 1903 to avoid the risk of the ship being acquired by Russia. Constitución became HMS Swiftsure in British service.

Swiftsure was decommissioned in 1917 and her guns were used for coast defence in Britain, as siege guns on the Belgian coast near Nieuport for attacking German batteries, and on M15-class monitors.

=== Mark IV ===
Mark IV guns were made by Vickers for the battleship Libertad they were building for Chile. Britain acquired them by default in 1903 when she bought Libertad together with Constitución. Libertad became HMS Triumph in British service.

== Surviving examples ==
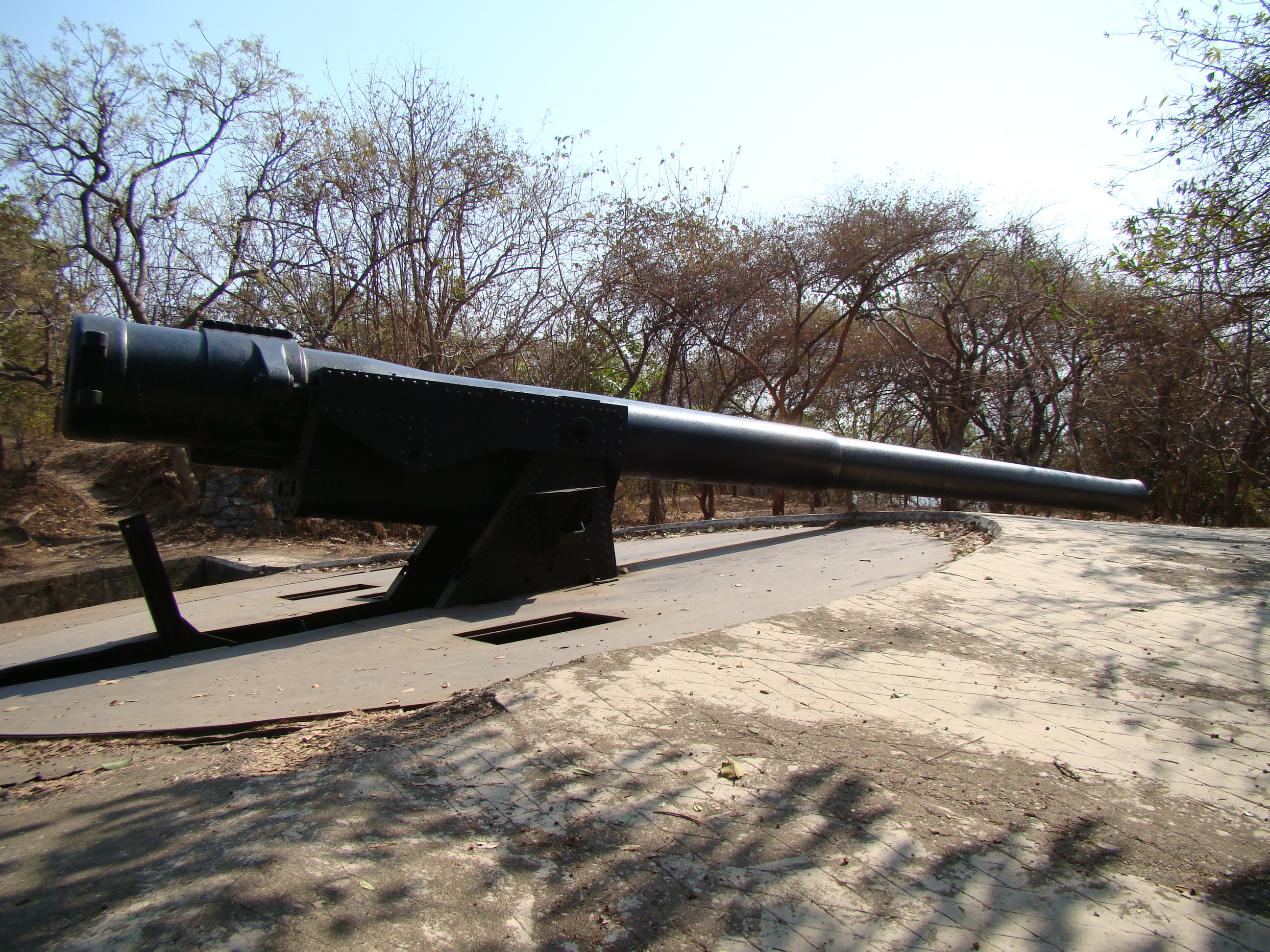
1906 RGF gun on Elephanta Island

- Two Mk II coast-defence guns made by EOC in 1905 and RGF in 1906, on Elephanta Island, Mumbai, India. Photographs on Flickr

== See also ==
- List of naval guns

== Bibliography ==
- Hogg, I.V. and Thurston, L.F. (1972). British Artillery Weapons & Ammunition 1914–1918. Ian Allan, London.
- Tony DiGiulian, British 7.5"/50 (19 cm) Mark III 7.5"/50 (19 cm) Mark IV
- Tony DiGiulian, British 7.5"/50 (19 cm) Mark II 7.5"/50 (19 cm) Mark V
