= Raylton Dixon =

Shipbuilder (1838–1901)

Sir Raylton Dixon
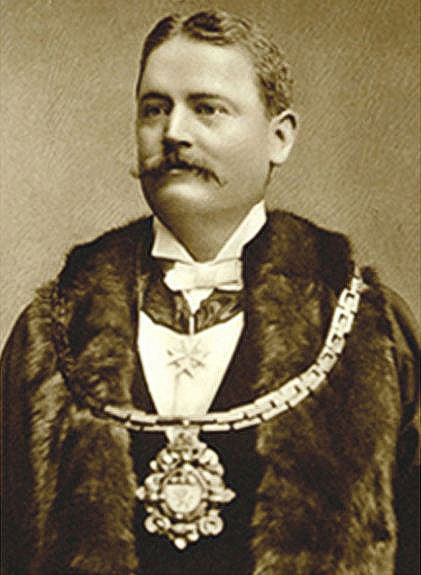
- Born: 8 July 1838; Durham, England
- Died: 28 July 1901; Middlesbrough, England
- Known for: Mayor of Middlesbrough
- Awards: knighthood for services to shipbuilding
- Scientific career
- Fields: Shipbuilding Industrialist
- Workplaces: 1889; Fellow of the Royal Society of Edinburgh,

Sir Raylton Dixon (8 July 1838 – 28 July 1901), was a shipbuilding magnate from Middlesbrough on the River Tees who served as Mayor of Middlesbrough.

== Background and early life ==
Dixon was one of the seven children of Jeremiah II Dixon (1804–1882) and Mary Frank (1803–1877) of Cockfield, County Durham who were married on 21 July 1833 in St Cuthbert's Church, Darlington. He was the great-grandson of George Dixon of Cockfield Canal fame, and great, great nephew of Jeremiah Dixon.

He was educated at Eton College and Trinity College, Oxford, where he studied Mathematics.

== Business life ==
The yard first did business under the name Backhouse & Dixon. Raylton Dixon started the firm of Raylton Dixon & Co. in 1873 with the substantial Dixon family coal mining fortune, and it operated until 1923 when it was dissolved. At the height of its production the three Dixon brothers, Raylton, John, and Waynman, were involved in running the company. In its 50-year life the Cleveland Dockyard built more than 600 vessels, the first ship, the iron steamship Torrington, being launched in 1874. The ship was later renamed Kwanon Maru No. 11 and ran aground and was wrecked off Yagoshi Point, Hokkaido on 7 March 1908. Raylton Dixon & Co earned a reputation for the construction of sound, large cargo-liners and during the 1890s had contracts with all the major shipping companies of the time. They also turned out refrigerated ships for the meat industry.

Dixon was a close friend of George Young Blair (1826–1894), whose firm, Blair & Co., built marine triple expansion engines and were fitted in Raylton Dixon ships.

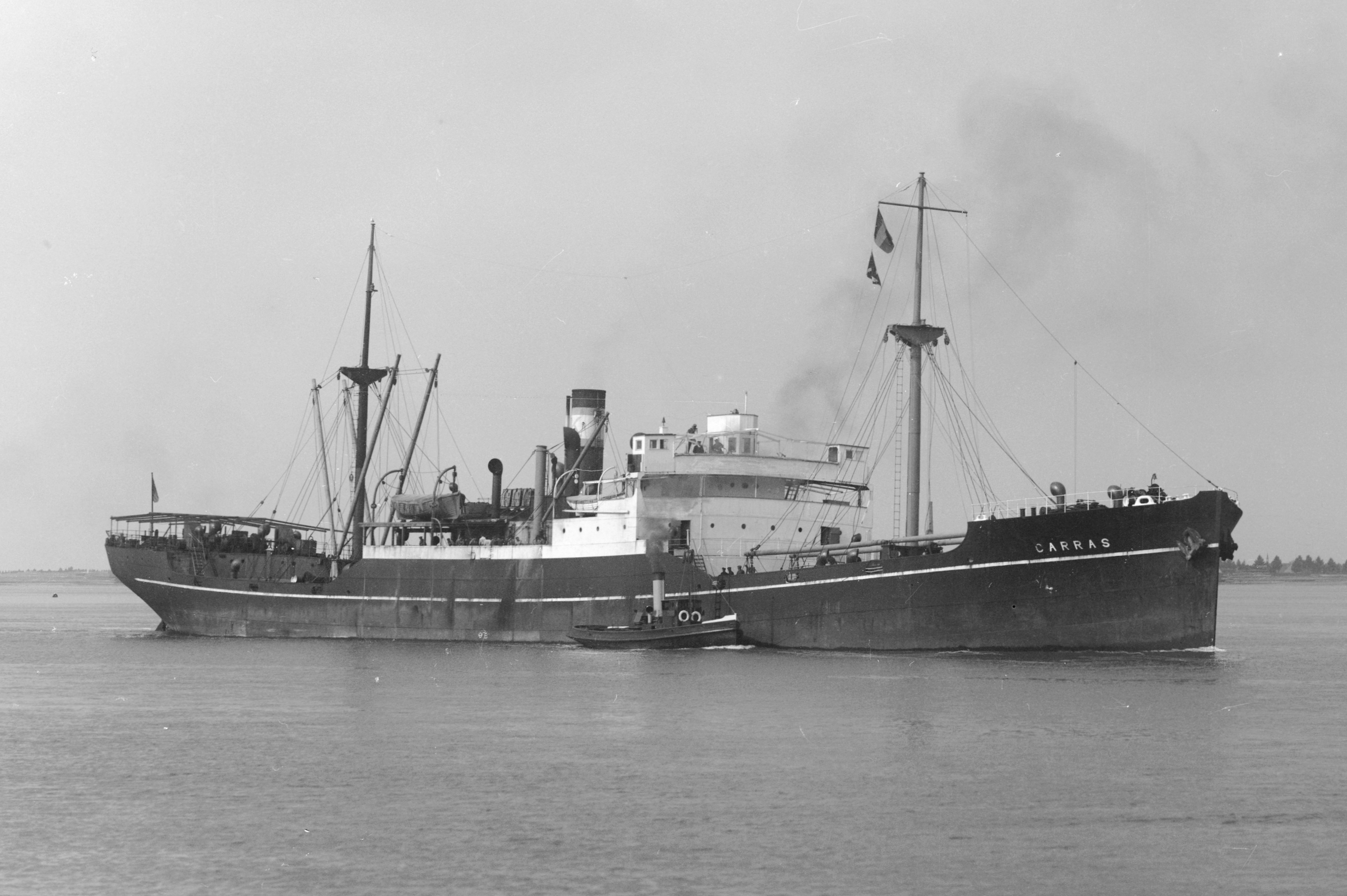
Yard number 613 Carras was built in 1918 as War Spartan

Raylton Dixon ships played an important role in world history. The Montrose was built in 1897 as a refrigerated cargo steamship, with berths for 12 first-class passengers. In 1900 she was chartered to make eight voyages to Cape Town, ferrying the Dublin & Denbigh Imperial Yeomanry, with their horses, to the Anglo-Boer War. In 1904 Doctor Crippen and his secretary, Ethel Le Neve, were aboard the ship and acted suspiciously, causing the master to radio Liverpool, resulting in their arrest on the St. Lawrence River. In 1914 she was sold to the admiralty for use as a blockship in Dover harbour, but broke her moorings in a gale and ran aground on the Goodwin Sands, her mast remaining visible until 1963. The general cargo steamship Mont-Blanc built at Raylton Dixon in 1899 devastated Halifax, Nova Scotia, Canada when she blew up with a cargo of ammunition in the 1917 Halifax Explosion.

Raylton Dixon was knighted in 1890 for his contributions to shipbuilding.

== Personal life ==
Dixon married on 5 August 1863 Elizabeth Walker, daughter of Robert Walker. She was born in 1841 and died in 1915, aged 74. They produced eight children:

- Mary Alice Elizabeth Raylton Dixon
- Florence Lilian Raylton Dixon
- Bessie May Raylton Dixon
- Ada Beatrice Averil Raylton Dixon
- Clive Macdonnell Raylton Dixon
- Mabel Cochrane Dixon, who married in 1902 Otho Cowen Bond.
- Harald Raylton Dixon
- Amy Gertrude Inga Raylton Dixon

Raylton Dixon bought Gunnergate Hall from Carl Bolkow in 1888 and lived there until his death in 1901. Raylton Dixon was buried in St Cuthbert's Marton churchyard.
