= Edgar-class cruiser =

Class of cruisers for the British Navy

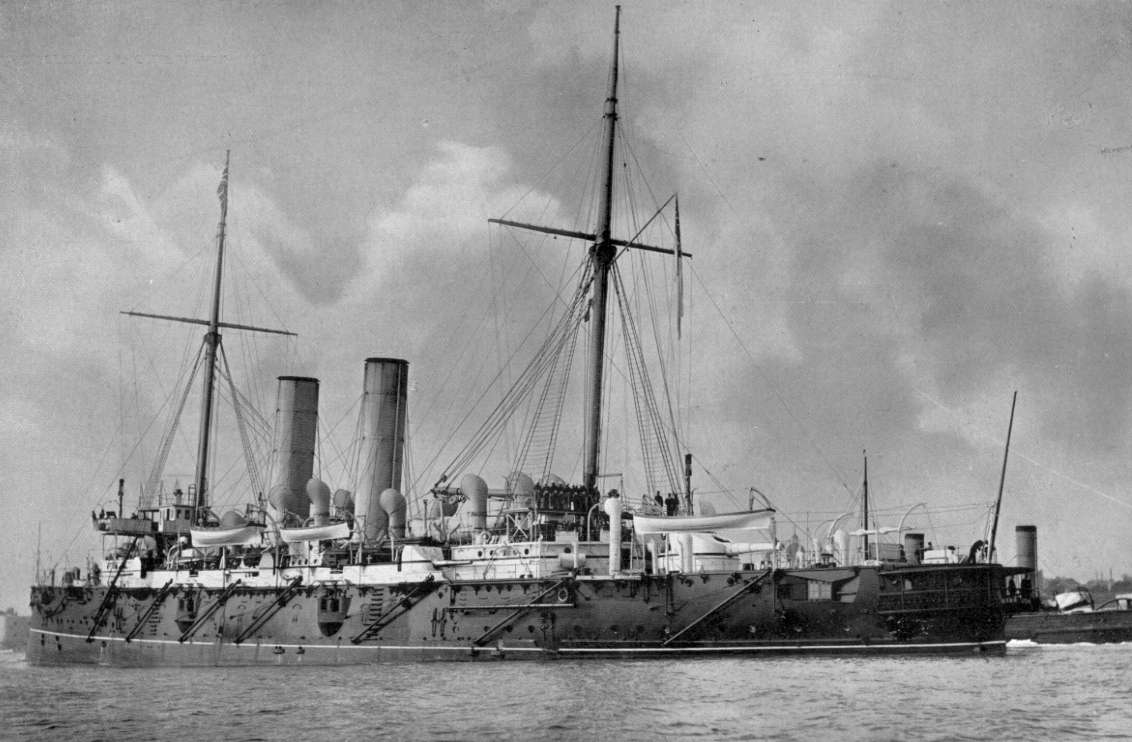
- HMS Gibraltar

Class overview
- Name: Edgar class
- Operators: Royal Navy
- Preceded by: Blake class
- Succeeded by: Powerful class
- Subclasses: Crescent
- Built: 1889–1894
- In commission: 1893–1921
- Completed: 9
- Lost: 1
- Scrapped: 8

General characteristics
- Type: First class protected cruiser
- Displacement: 7,700 tons
- Length: 387 ft 6 in (118.11 m)
- Beam: 60 ft (18.3 m)
- Draught: 24 ft (7.3 m)
- Propulsion: 2 shafts, 12,000hp
- Speed: 20 knots (37 km/h) forced draught
- Range: 10,000 nautical miles (19,000 km) at 10 knots (19 km/h; 12 mph)
- Complement: 544
- Armament: 2 × BL 9.2-inch (230 mm) Mk VI guns; 10 × QF 6-inch (150 mm) guns; 12 × 6-pounder (57-mm) guns; 4 × torpedo tubes for 18-inch (450-mm) torpedoes

The Edgar class were nine first-class protected cruisers built for the Royal Navy under the Naval Defence Act 1889. The class gave long service and all of the ships participated in the First World War. HMS Hawke, was lost during the war, with the other eight being scrapped in the 1920s.

== Design ==
Nine new first-class cruisers were required by the Naval Defence Act. Although the Blake-class cruisers were impressive ships and powerful, they were too large and expensive to simply repeat en masse.

The new ships were envisioned as reduced version of Blake and Blenheim, retaining the same main armament of two 9.2-inch BL guns and ten 6-inch QF guns. The 9.2-inch pieces were mounted singly on the centreline at either end of the upper deck, on turntable mountings provided with thickly armoured open-backed gun shields which resembled turrets. The 6-inch battery was divided between two decks on each beam, with six upper deck guns (three on each beam) and four on the main deck, two to a beam. The main deck guns were in casemates, while the six upper deck guns were protected by shields. For close-range defence against torpedo boats there were 12 QF 6-pounder Hotchkiss guns and four QF 3-pounder Hotchkiss guns. Armament was completed with four 18-inch torpedo tubes.

Displacement was reduced by 1,800 tons from Blake, length between perpendiculars by 15 feet. Propulsion came from steam expansion engines, driving two shafts. With funnels as tall as the Blake class, the Edgars appeared stockier than the preceding ships. Despite this, slimming their beam by 5 feet, slightly reducing draught and providing highly reliable 12,000 ihp machinery (compared with the previous troublesome 13,000 ihp installation) meant the new ships would practically match their two larger predecessors' steaming performance.

The Edgar class' main armour protection was an internal protective deck, consisting of 5 in (130 mm)-thick steel armour on the outboard slopes, which connected with the hull plating just below waterline level and rose up the further it extended into the ship, with 3 in (76 mm) on the flat of the deck over the magazines and machinery spaces. The gun casemates were 6 in (150 mm) thick, with 3 in (76 mm) shields for the 9.2-inch guns. The conning tower had 10 in (250 mm) armour. Four of the Edgar class were fitted with anti-torpedo bulge during refitting in 1914.

Crescent and Royal Arthur were intended to operate as flagships for cruiser squadrons on foreign stations. They were built to a slightly modified design and are sometimes considered a separate class. To accommodate the additional flag officers and staff in the forward part of the ship, they had a forecastle one deck higher than their sisters'. This additional weight forwards was balanced by the deletion of the forward 9.2-inch gun and its very heavy armoured gun shield, with sufficient weight allowance remaining afterwards for two additional 6-inch guns to be placed, sided, atop the forecastle in light open-backed shields.

== Building programme ==
The following table gives the build details and purchase cost of the members of the Edgar class. Standard British practice was for these costs to exclude armament and stores.

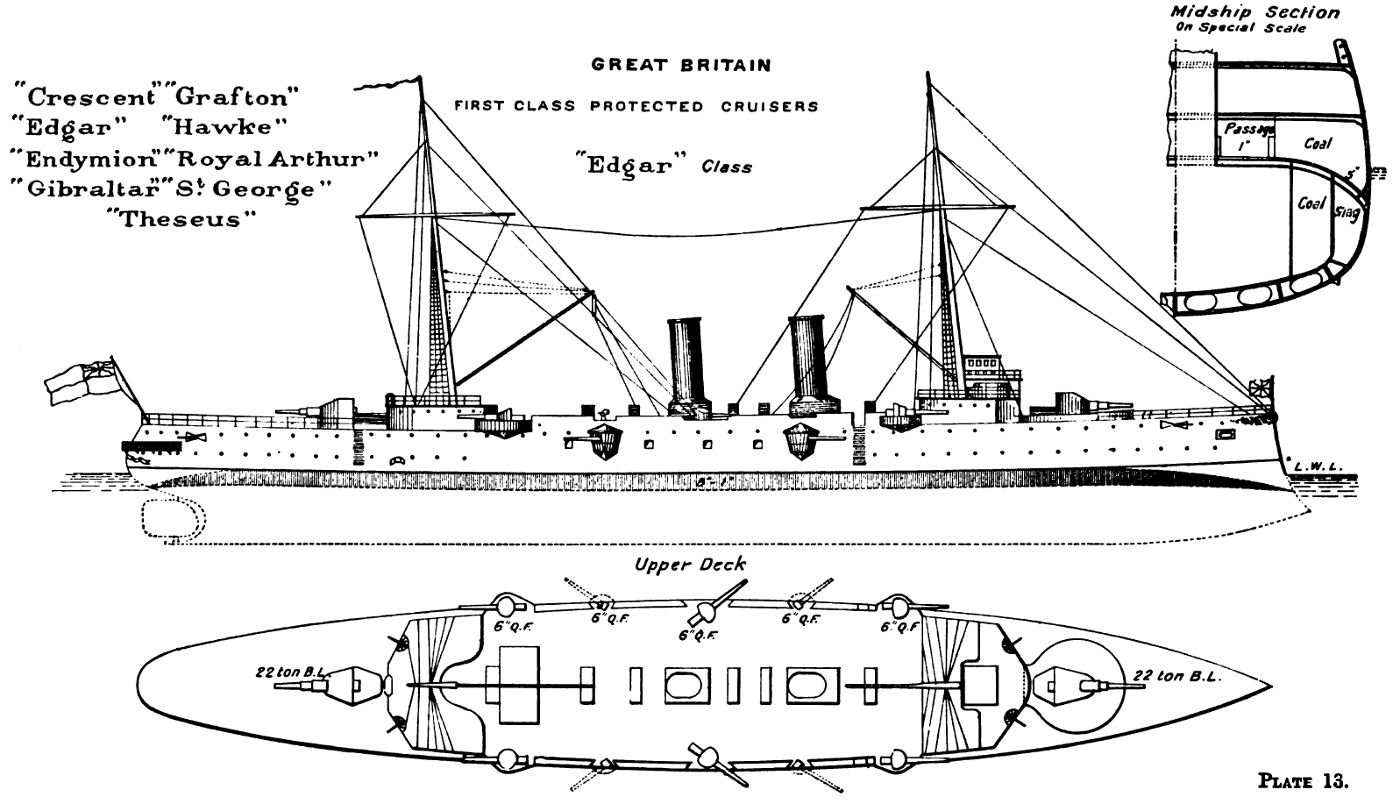
Right elevation, deck plan and hull section as depicted in Brassey's Naval Annual 1897

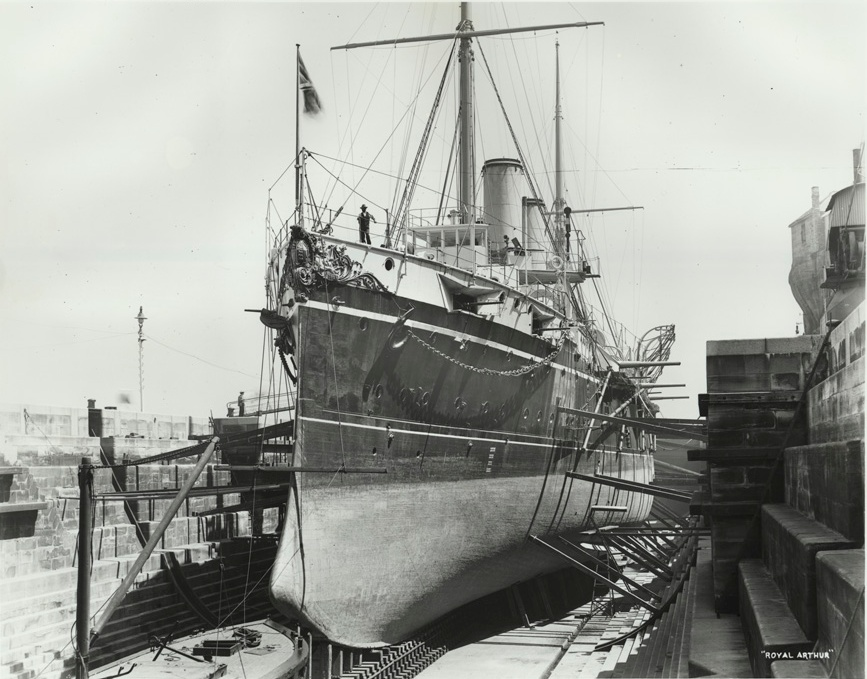
The bow of HMS Royal Arthur while drydocked in Sydney.

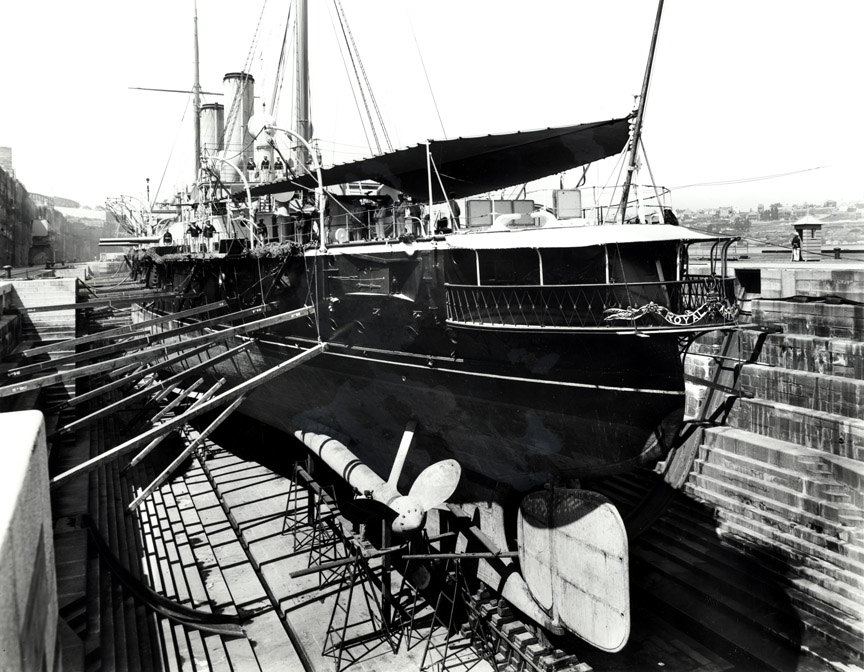
The stern of HMS Royal Arthur while drydocked in Sydney.

Ship	Subclass	Builder	Maker of Engines	Construction			Cost according to Brassey's Naval Annual		
Ship	Subclass	Builder	Maker of Engines	Laid down	Launched	Completed	BNA 1895	BNA 1905	BNA 1906
Edgar		Devonport Dockyard	Elder	3 Jun 1889	24 Nov 1890	2 Mar 1893	£401,083	£428,081	£410,980
Hawke		Chatham Dockyard	Elder	16 Jun 1889	11 Mar 1891	16 May 1893	£365,491	£413,101	£400,702
Endymion		C & W Earle, Hull	Earle	22 Nov 1889	22 July 1891	26 May 1894	£350,459	£397,973	£375,250
Royal Arthur ex-Centaur	Crescent	Portsmouth Dockyard	Maudslay	20 Jan 1890	26 Feb 1891	2 Mar 1893	£402,414	£427,620	£412,033
Gibraltar		Robert Napier & Sons, Govan	Napier	2 Dec 1889	27 Apr 1892	1 Nov 1894	£347,634	£377,741	£373,236
Grafton		Thames Ironworks Leamouth	Humphrys	1 Jan 1890	30 Jan 1892	18 Oct 1894	£351,851	£381,958	£372,890
St George		C & W Earle, Hull	Maudslay	23 Apr 1890	23 Jun 1892	25 Oct 1894	£377,204	£407,540	£388,755
Theseus		Thames Ironworks Leamouth	Maudslay	16 Jul 1890	8 Sep 1892	14 Jan 1894	£347,577	£377,913	£370,359
Crescent	Crescent	Portsmouth Dockyard	Penn	13 Oct 1890	30 Mar 1892	22 Feb 1894	£383,068	£411,108	£392,453
