= BL 9.2-inch Mk I – VII naval gun =

Ordnance BL 9.2-inch Mk I–VII gun
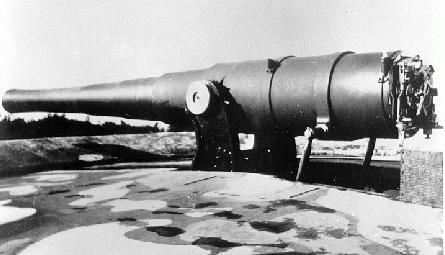
- Mk VI gun on disappearing mounting at Ben Buckler Gun Battery, Sydney
- Type: Naval gun Coast defence gun
- Place of origin: United Kingdom

Service history
- In service: 1881–1918
- Used by: Royal Navy; Australian colonies
- Wars: World War I

Production history
- Variants: Mk I – VII

Specifications
- Mass: Mk I & II : 20 tons barrel & breech Mk III : 24 tons Mk V–VII : 22 tons
- Barrel length: Mk I & II : 230 inches (5,842 mm) bore & chamber (25 calibres); Mk III–VII : 290 inches (7,366 mm) (31.5 calibres)
- Shell: 380 pounds (172.37 kg); 290 pounds (131.54 kg) (High-angle guns)
- Calibre: 9.2-inch (233.7 mm)
- Muzzle velocity: 2,065 feet per second (629 m/s)
- Maximum firing range: 10,000 yards (9,100 m) (Note: 10,000 yards refers to naval mountings which had limited elevation : Text book of gunnery, 1902. Coast and rail mountings allowed greater elevation and hence range.)

The BL 9.2-inch Mk I–VII guns (Note: i.e. Marks 1 to 7. Britain denoted marks (models) of ordnance using Roman numerals until after World War II.) were a family of early British heavy breechloading naval and coast defence guns in service from 1881 to the end of World War I. They were originally designed to use the old gunpowder propellants.

== History ==
=== Mk I and II ===
British 9.2 inch guns originated from a request by the Admiralty in 1879 for a gun comparable to Krupp's 24 cm MRK L/25.5, a very powerful 9.45 inch gun tested in August 1879. The Admiralty submitted its request to the Committee on Ordnance, which was considering returning to breech-loading artillery after Britain's brief return to muzzle-loaders in the 1860s and 1870s. A new breech-loading gun with a 9.2-inch (234 mm) bore, firing a 380-pound projectile was calculated to be suitable. A total of 19 Mk I and Mk II guns of 26 calibres were made starting in 1881, but after lengthy delays and modifications they proved unsatisfactory and none made it to sea.

=== Mk III – Mk VII ===
The 31.5 calibres versions, Mk III through to Mk VII became the first to be mounted on ships and deployed in general service.

== Naval service ==
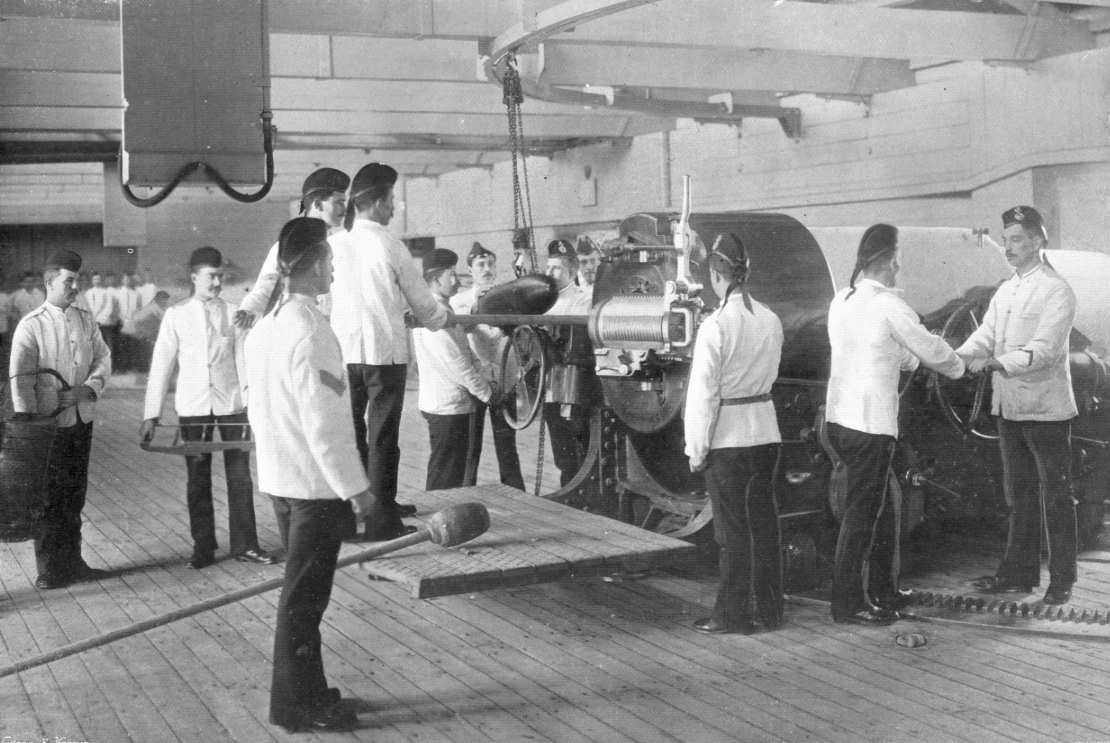
Training drill, 1890s

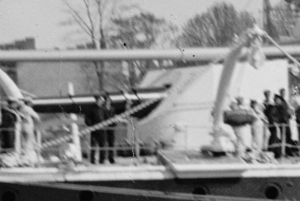
Forward gun on HMS Australia, 1893

Guns equipped the following ships :

- Imperieuse-class armoured cruisers launched in 1883 : Mk III
- Orlando- class armoured cruisers launched 1886 : Mk V & VI
- Blake-class protected cruisers launched 1889 : Mk VI
- Edgar-class protected cruisers launched 1890 : Mk VI
- HMS Alexandra as re-gunned in 1891
- HMS Rupert as re-gunned in 1892
- M15-class monitors M19 – M28 launched 1915 : Mk VI guns from Edgar-class cruisers.

== Coast defence gun ==
Most Mk IV guns and some Mk VI guns were used in coast defences.

In the mid-to-late 1880s successful trials were carried out with RML 9-inch coast-defence guns firing at high angles in order to test the effectiveness of plunging fire on decks of ships. When surplus BL 9.2 inch Mk IV and Mk VI guns became available in the 1890s they were likewise adapted to high-angle carriages, with their obsolete 3-motion breech mechanisms replaced by modern continuous-motion patterns to allow faster loading. Locations included Hawkins Battery near Plymouth and Gibraltar.

The elevation of up to 45° meant that the shell was at risk of slipping back after being rammed forward as only the copper driving band held the shell in place in a BL gun, and they had not been designed to operate at such high angles. The solution adopted was to develop a special high-angle reduced-charge cartridge with a hollow up the centre, through which the gunner inserted a 1 1/4-inch-diameter (32 mm) stick about 40 inches long made of beech wood, to prevent the projectile from slipping back before firing. A "light" 290-pound (130 kg) shell was used for high-angle firing, rather than the standard 380-pound (170 kg) shell.

In the late 19th century to early 20th century five Mk IV coast-defence guns were installed at Singapore : two at Fort Connaught on Blakang Mati, one at Fort Siloso on Sentosa Island and two at Fort Pasir Panjang on Singapore Island. Two of these remain at Fort Siloso.

== World War I railway gun ==
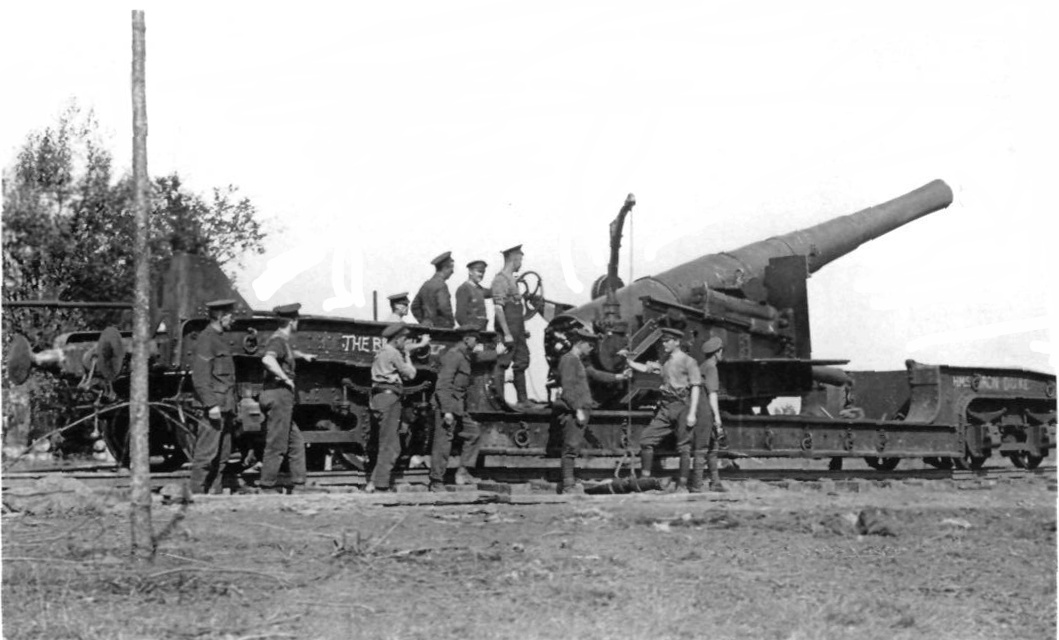
HMS Iron Duke, a Mk III* or Mk VI gun in action at Maricourt, Battle of the Somme, September 1916

From 1915 onwards Elswick adapted a small number of Mk III, Mk IV and Mk VI guns, and mounted them on railway truck mountings for service on the Western Front in France and Belgium.

== Australian service ==
In the late 1880s and early 1890s the Australian colonies between them ordered 10 barrels and nine carriages for BL 9.2 inch Mk VI 'counter bombardment' disappearing guns:

- New South Wales : Three went to protect Sydney Harbour, plus an extra barrel. Of these, one went to Ben Buckler Gun Battery, one to Signal Hill Battery, and one to Steel Point Battery. The barrel of the gun that had been installed at Signal Hill Battery survives on public display at the Royal Australian Artillery Museum at North Fort, North Head. The gun and carriage of the Ben Buckler gun were unearthed in 1984 and await restoration.
- Victoria : Four guns went to Victoria to protect Port Phillip, with two going to Fort Nepean and two going to Fort Queenscliff.
- South Australia : In 1888, South Australia purchased two guns for what was to be Fort Glenelg to protect Adelaide, South Australia. The residents of Glenelg, concerned that they might become a military target, blocked construction of the Fort and the guns were never installed. The British government bought them back in 1915.

== Ammunition ==
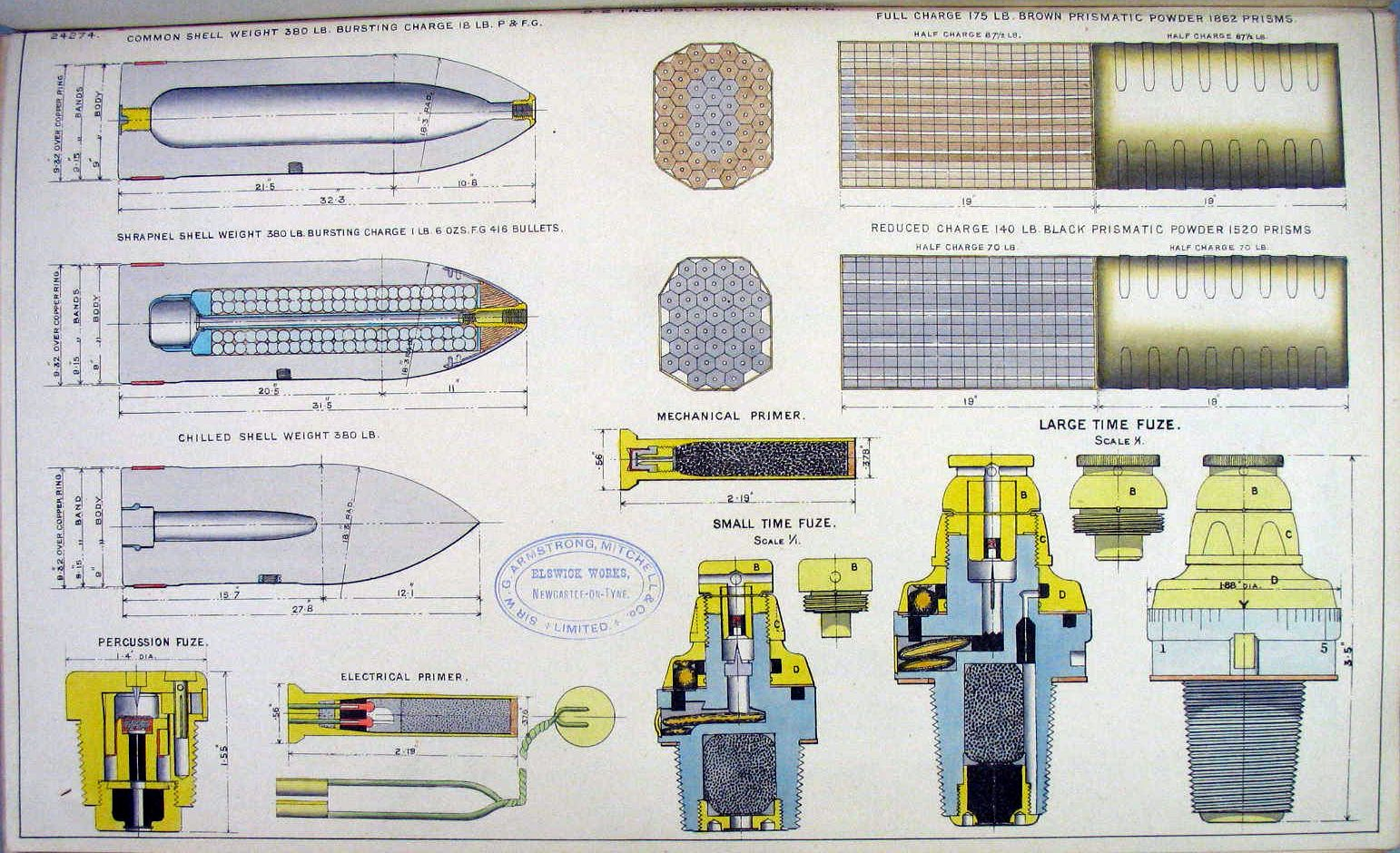
Ammunition for early Armstrong 25 calibres gun

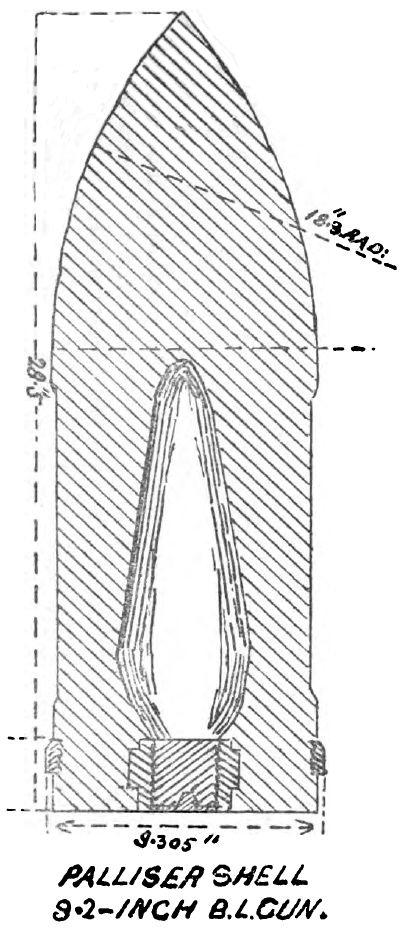
Palliser shell

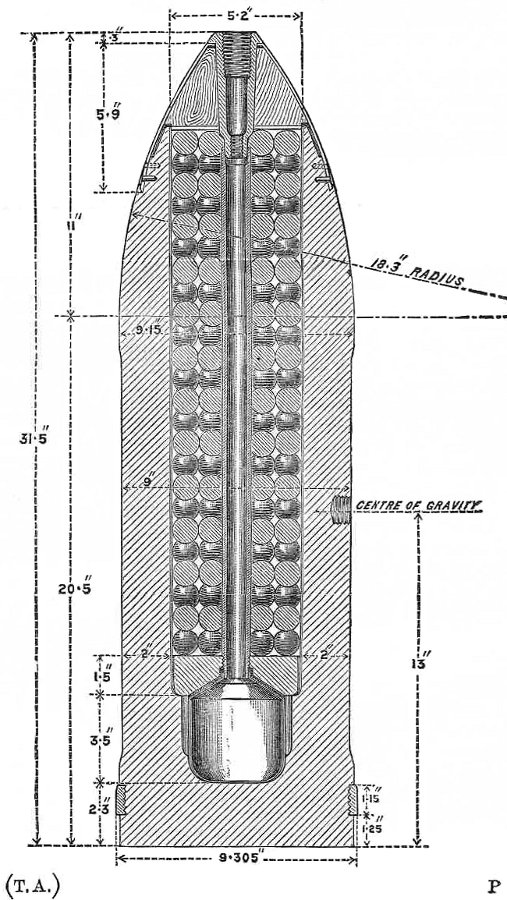
Boxer shrapnel shell

== Surviving examples ==
- 2 Mk IV guns at Fort Siloso, Sentosa Island, Singapore
- EOC Mk VII gun No. 7318 dated 1881, originally mounted at Signal Hill, Vaucluse at Royal Australian Artillery National Museum, North Head, Sydney, Australia
- A previously buried disappearing gun at Ben Buckler, Sydney, awaiting restoration
1. One Mark I located in Port Royal, Jamaica, on the shores at Fort Charles. Stamped with Mark I 9.2 inch 22 ton gun lying next to its battery and Powder House. Taken out of service after the 1907 earthquake.

== See also ==
- List of naval guns

== Bibliography ==
- Text Book of Gunnery, 1887. LONDON : PRINTED FOR HIS MAJESTY'S STATIONERY OFFICE, BY HARRISON AND SONS, ST. MARTIN'S LANE
- Text Book of Gunnery, 1902. LONDON : PRINTED FOR HIS MAJESTY'S STATIONERY OFFICE, BY HARRISON AND SONS, ST. MARTIN'S LANE
- Treatise on Ammunition, 10th Edition 1915. War Office, UK. Facsimile reprint published by Imperial War Museum and Naval & Military Press, 2003. ISBN 1-8434-2560-2
- Hogg, I.V. and Thurston, L.F. (1972). British Artillery Weapons & Ammunition 1914–1918. Ian Allan, London. ISBN 0-7110-0381-5
- Tony DiGiulian, British 9.2"/31.5 (23.4 cm) Marks III to VII
