= List of ship names of the Royal Navy (M–N) =

This is a list of Royal Navy ship names starting with M and N.

== M ==
- M1
- M2
- M3
- M13
- M14
- M15
- M16
- M17
- M18
- M19
- M20
- M21
- M22
- M23
- M24
- M25
- M26
- M27
- M28
- M29
- M30
- M31
- M32
- M33
- MI
- MII
- MIII
- MIV
- MV
- MVI
- MVII
- MVIII
- MTB102
- MV1
- MV2
- MV3
- MV4
- MV5
- MV6
- MV7
- MV8
- MV9
- MV10
- MV11
- MV12
- MV13
- MV14
- MV15
- MV16
- MV17
- MV18
- MV19
- MV20
- MV21
- MV22
- Macassa
- Macduff
- Macedonian
- Machine
- Mackay
- Mackerel
- Madagascar
- Maddiston
- Madras
- Maeander
- Maenad
- Maesterland
- Magdala
- Magdalen
- Magic
- Magician
- Magicienne
- Magnanime
- Magnet
- Magnificent
- Magpie
- Mahonesa
- Mahratta
- Maida
- Maiden Castle
- Maidstone
- Majestic
- Makassar
- Malabar
- Malacca
- Malaga Merchant
- Malaya
- Malcolm
- Malham
- Malice
- Mallard
- Malling Castle
- Mallow
- Malmesbury Castle
- Maloja
- Malplaquet
- Malta
- Malvern
- Mamaduke
- Mameluke
- Manchester
- Mandarin
- Mandate
- Mandrake
- Manela
- Manica
- Manilla
- Manly
- Manners
- Mansfield
- Mantis
- Manxman
- Maori
- Maplin
- Marathon
- Marazion
- Marengo
- Margaret
- Margate
- Margett
- Marguerite
- Maria de Loreto
- Maria Prize
- Maria Sancta
- Maria Sandwich
- Maria Spayne
- Maria
- Mariana
- Marianne
- Marie Antoinette
- Marigold
- Mariner
- Marjoram
- Marksman
- Marlborough
- Marlingford
- Marlion
- Marlow
- Marmion
- Marne
- Maroon
- Marquise de Seignelay
- Mars
- Marshal Ney
- Marshal Soult
- Marsouin
- Marston Moor
- Martah & Mary
- Martial
- Martin Garcia
- Martin
- Marvel
- Mary
- Mary & John
- Mary Ann
- Mary Antrim
- Mary Breton
- Mary Flyboat
- Mary Fortune
- Mary Galley
- Mary George
- Mary Gloria
- Mary Grace
- Mary Guildford
- Mary Hamboro
- Mary Hampton
- Mary Imperial
- Mary James
- Mary Norwell
- Mary Odierne
- Mary of Rouen
- Mary Prize
- Mary Rose
- Mary Thomas
- Mary Willoughby
- Maryanee
- Maryborough
- Maryport
- Maryton
- Mashona
- Mason
- Mastiff
- Matabele
- Matane
- Matapan
- Matchless
- Mathias
- Matilda
- Matthew
- Mauritius
- Mavourneen
- Mawdelyn
- Maxton
- May Frere
- Mayflower
- Mayfly
- Mayford
- Mazurka
- Meadowsweet
- Mecklenburgh
- Meda
- Medea
- Medee
- Mediator
- Medina
- Mediterranean
- Medora
- Medusa
- Medway
- Medway II
- Medway Prize
- Meeanee
- Megaera
- Miermen
- Melampe
- Melampus
- Melbreak
- Meleager
- Melita
- Melpomene
- Melton
- Melville
- Memnon
- Menace
- Menai
- Mendip
- Menelaus
- Menestheus
- Mentor
- Meon
- Mercure
- Mercurius
- Mercury
- Meredith
- Merhonour
- Merlin
- Mermaid
- Merope
- Merry Hampton
- Mersey
- Mersham
- Messenger
- Messina
- Meteor
- Meteorite
- Meynell
- Michael
- Mickleham
- Middlesbrough
- Middleton
- Midge
- Mignonette
- Mignonne
- Milan
- Milbrook
- Mileham
- Milfoil
- Milford
- Milne
- Mimi
- Mimico
- Mimosa
- Minas
- Minden
- Mindful
- Minehead
- Miner I
- Miner II
- Miner III
- Miner IV
- Miner V
- Miner VI
- Miner VII
- Miner VIII
- Minerva
- Minerve
- Mingan
- Minion
- Minnikin
- Minorca
- Minoru
- Minos
- Minotaur
- Minstrel
- Minto
- Minuet
- Minx
- Miramichi
- Miranda
- Mischief
- Misoa
- Mississauga
- Mistletoe
- Mistley
- Mistral
- Mitchell
- Moa
- Modbury
- Moderate
- Modeste
- Mohawk
- Moira
- Monaghan
- Monarca
- Monarch
- Mona's Isle
- Monck
- Monck Prize
- Mondara
- Mondovi
- Mongoose
- Monitor
- Monkey
- Monkshood
- Monkton
- Monmouth Castle
- Monmouth
- Monow
- Monowai
- Mons
- Monsieur
- Mont Blanc
- Montagu
- Montbretia
- Montego Bay
- Montford
- Montgomery
- Montreal
- Montrose
- Montserrat
- Mooltan
- Moon
- Moorhen
- Moorsom
- Moray Firth
- Mordaunt
- Morecambe Bay
- Moresby
- Morgiana
- Morne Fortunee
- Morning Star
- Moro
- Morpeth Castle
- Morris Dance
- Morris
- Mortar
- Mosambique
- Moselle
- Moslem
- Mosquito
- Mosquidobit
- Moth
- Moucheron
- Mounsey
- Mount Edgcumbe
- Mounts Bay
- Mourne
- Moy
- Moyola
- Mulette
- Mulgrave
- Mull
- Mull of Galloway
- Mull of Kintyre
- Mull of Oa
- Mullett
- Mullion Cove
- Mullion
- Munlochy
- Munster
- Muros
- Murray
- Musette
- Musk
- Muskerry
- Musket
- Musketeer
- Mosquidobit
- Musquito
- Mustico
- Mutine
- Myngs
- Myosotis
- Myrmidon
- Myrtle
- Mystic

== N ==
- N1
- Naas
- Nabob
- Nadder
- Nadur
- Naiad
- Nailsea
- Nairana
- Namur
- Nancy
- Nankin
- Nantwich
- Napier
- Narbada
- Narborough
- Narcissus
- Narvik
- Narwhal
- Naseby
- Nassau
- Nasturtium
- Natal
- Nathaniell
- Nautilus
- Navarino
- Navy Board
- Navy Transport
- Navy
- Nazareth
- Nearque
- Necker
- Ned Elvin
- Negresse
- Negro
- Nelson
- Nemesis
- Nene
- Nepal
- Nepaulin
- Nepean
- Nepeta
- Neptune
- Nerbudda
- Nereide
- Nereus
- Nerissa
- Nesbitt
- Ness
- Nessus
- Nestor
- Netley
- Nettle
- Nettlham
- New Adventure
- New Betsey
- New Zealand
- Newark
- Newash
- Newbark
- Newbury
- Newcastle
- Newfoundland
- Newhaven
- Newmarket
- Newport
- Newquay
- Newton
- Neza
- Niagara
- Nicator
- Nicholas Reede
- Nicholas
- Nicodemus
- Niemen
- Nieuport
- Nigella
- Niger
- Nigeria
- Nighthawk
- Nightingale
- Nijaden
- Nilam
- Nile
- Nimble
- Nimrod
- Niobe
- Nipigon
- Nisus
- Nith
- Nitrocris
- Nizam
- Noble
- Nomad
- Nonpareil
- Nonsuch
- Noranda
- Nordland
- Norfolk
- Norge
- Norham Castle
- Norman
- Norseman
- Norsyd
- North
- North Bay
- North Star
- Northampton
- Northella
- Northern Rover
- Northesk
- Northolt
- Northrepps
- Northumbria
- Northumberland
- Northway
- Norwich
- Norwich Castle
- Nottingham
- Nottingham Prize
- Nova Scotia
- Nox
- Nubian
- Nuestra Senora del Rosario
- Nugent
- Nunney Castle
- Nurton
- Nusa
- Nyaden
- Nyasaland
- Nymph
- Nymphe
- Nymphen

== See also ==
- List of aircraft carriers of the Royal Navy
- List of amphibious warfare ships of the Royal Navy
- List of battlecruisers of the Royal Navy
- List of pre-dreadnought battleships of the Royal Navy
- List of dreadnought battleships of the Royal Navy
- List of cruiser classes of the Royal Navy
- List of destroyer classes of the Royal Navy
- List of patrol vessels of the Royal Navy
- List of frigate classes of the Royal Navy
- List of mine countermeasure vessels of the Royal Navy (includes minesweepers and mine hunters)
- List of monitors of the Royal Navy
- List of Royal Fleet Auxiliary ship names
- List of Royal Navy shore establishments
- List of submarines of the Royal Navy
- List of survey vessels of the Royal Navy
