= SMS Grosser Kurfürst (1913) =

Battleship of the German Imperial Navy

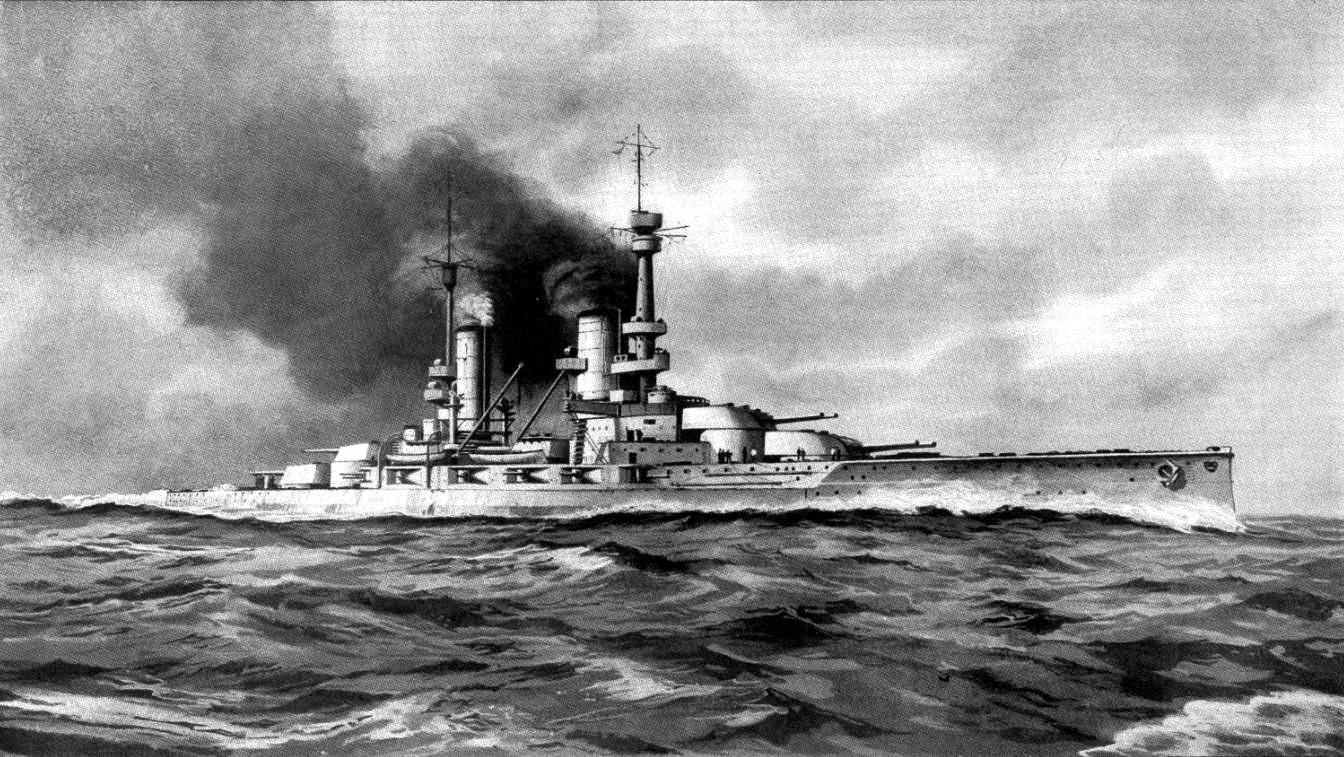
- Recognition drawing of a König-class battleship

History

German Empire
- Namesake: SMS Grosser Kurfürst
- Builder: AG Vulcan, Hamburg
- Laid down: October 1911
- Launched: 5 May 1913
- Commissioned: 30 July 1914
- Fate: Scuttled 21 June 1919 in Gutter Sound; raised 29 April 1938 and sold for scrap

General characteristics
- Class & type: König-class battleship
- Displacement: Normal: 25,796 t (25,389 long tons); Full load: 28,600 t (28,100 long tons)
- Length: 175.4 m (575 ft 6 in)
- Beam: 29.5 m (96 ft 9 in)
- Draft: 9.19 m (30 ft 2 in)
- Installed power: 3 × oil-fired water-tube boilers; 12 × coal-fired water-tube boilers; 45,570 shp (33,980 kW)
- Propulsion: 3 × steam turbines; 3 × screw propellers
- Speed: 21 knots (39 km/h; 24 mph)
- Range: 8,000 nmi (15,000 km; 9,200 mi) at 12 knots (22 km/h; 14 mph)
- Complement: 41 officers; 1,095 enlisted men
- Armament: 10 × 30.5 cm (12 in) guns; 14 × 15 cm (5.9 in) guns; 10 × 8.8 cm (3.5 in) guns; 5 × 50 cm (19.7 in) torpedo tubes
- Armor: Belt: 12 to 35 cm (4.7 to 13.8 in); Deck: 6 to 10 cm (2.4 to 3.9 in); Conning tower: 30 cm (11.8 in); Turrets: 30 cm; Casemates: 15 cm

SMS Grosser Kurfürst (Note: "SMS" stands for "Seiner Majestät Schiff" (English: His Majesty's Ship).) was the second dreadnought battleship of the four-ship König class. Grosser Kurfürst (or Großer (Note: This is the German "sharp S"; see ß.) Kurfürst) served in the Imperial German Navy during World War I. The battleship was laid down in October 1911 and launched on 5 May 1913. She was formally commissioned into the Imperial Navy on 30 July 1914, days before the outbreak of war between Germany and the United Kingdom. Her name means "Great Elector", and refers to Frederick William I, the Prince-elector of Brandenburg. Grosser Kurfürst was armed with ten 30.5-centimeter (12 in) guns in five twin turrets and could steam at a top speed of 21 knots (39 km/h; 24 mph).

Along with her three sister ships, König, Markgraf, and Kronprinz, Grosser Kurfürst took part in most of the fleet actions during the war, including the Battle of Jutland on 31 May and 1 June 1916. The ship was subjected to heavy fire at Jutland, but was not seriously damaged. She shelled Russian positions during Operation Albion in September and October 1917. Grosser Kurfürst was involved in a number of accidents during her service career; she collided with König and Kronprinz, grounded several times, was torpedoed once, and hit a mine.

After Germany's defeat and the signing of the Armistice in November 1918, Grosser Kurfürst and most of the capital ships of the High Seas Fleet were interned by the Royal Navy in Scapa Flow. The ships were disarmed and limited to skeleton crews while the Allied powers negotiated the final version of the Treaty of Versailles. On 21 June 1919, days before the treaty was signed, the commander of the interned fleet, Rear Admiral Ludwig von Reuter, ordered the fleet to be scuttled to ensure that the British would not be able to seize the ships. Unlike her sister ships, Grosser Kurfürst was raised in 1938 for scrapping and subsequently broken up in Rosyth.

== Design ==
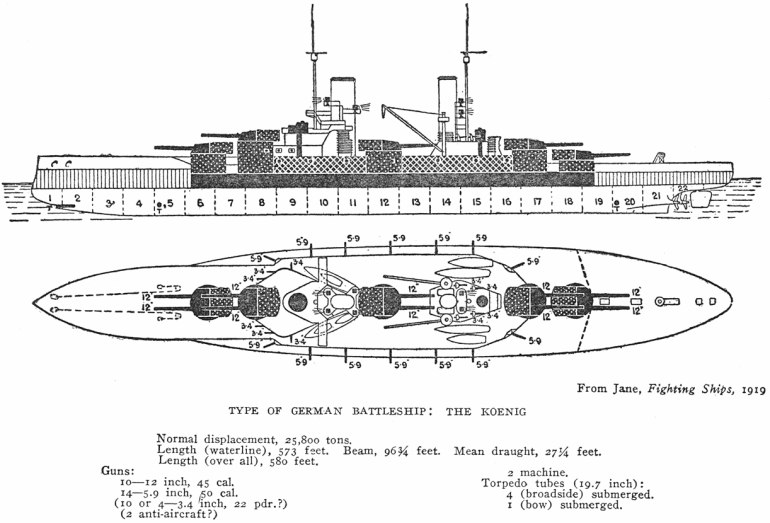
Plan and elevation view of a ship of the König class, from Jane's Fighting Ships 1919

The four König-class battleships were ordered as part of the Anglo-German naval arms race; they were the fourth generation of German dreadnought battleships, and they were built in response to the British Orion class that had been ordered in 1909. The Königs represented a refinement of the earlier Kaiser class, with the primary improvement being a more efficient arrangement of the main battery. The ships had also been intended to use a diesel engine on the center propeller shaft to increase their cruising range, but development of the diesels proved to be more complicated than expected, so an all-steam turbine powerplant was retained.

Grosser Kurfürst displaced 25,796 t (25,389 long tons) as built and 28,600 t (28,100 long tons) fully loaded, with a length of 175.4 m (575 ft 6 in), a beam of 29.5 m (96 ft 9 in) and a draft of 9.19 m (30 ft 2 in). She was powered by three AEG-Vulcan steam turbines, with steam provided by three oil-fired and twelve coal-fired Schulz-Thornycroft water-tube boilers, which developed a total of 45,570 shaft horsepower (33,980 kW) and yielded a maximum speed of 21 knots (39 km/h; 24 mph). The ship had a range of 8,000 nautical miles (15,000 km; 9,200 mi) at a cruising speed of 12 knots (22 km/h; 14 mph). Her crew numbered 41 officers and 1,095 enlisted men.

She was armed with ten 30.5 cm (12 in) SK L/50 guns arranged in five twin gun turrets: (Note: In Imperial German Navy gun nomenclature, "SK" (Schnelladekanone) denotes that the gun is quick loading, while the L/50 denotes the length of the gun. In this case, the L/50 gun is 50 calibers, meaning that the gun is 45 times as long as it is in bore diameter.) two superfiring turrets each fore and aft and one turret amidships between the two funnels. Her secondary armament consisted of fourteen 15 cm (5.9 in) SK L/45 quick-firing guns and six 8.8 cm (3.5 in) SK L/45 quick-firing guns, all mounted singly in casemates. As was customary for capital ships of the period, she was also armed with five 50 cm (19.7 in) underwater torpedo tubes, one in the bow and two on each beam.

The ship's armored belt consisted of Krupp cemented steel that was 35 cm (13.8 in) thick in the central citadel that protected the propulsion machinery spaces and the ammunition magazines, and was reduced to 18 cm (7.1 in) forward and 12 cm (4.7 in) aft. In the central portion of the ship, horizontal protection consisted of a 10 cm (3.9 in) deck, which was reduced to 4 cm (1.6 in) on the bow and stern. The main battery turrets had 30 cm (11.8 in) of armor plate on the sides and 11 cm (4.3 in) on the roofs, while the casemate guns had 15 cm (5.9 in) of armor protection. The sides of the forward conning tower were also 30 cm thick.

== Service history ==
Grosser Kurfürst was ordered under the provisional name Ersatz Kurfürst Friedrich Wilhelm, (Note: German warships were ordered under provisional names. Additions to the fleet were given a single letter; ships intended to replace older or lost vessels were ordered as "Ersatz (name of the ship to be replaced)".) and built at the AG Vulcan shipyard in Hamburg under construction number 4. Her keel was laid down in October 1911 and she was launched on 5 May 1913. At her launching ceremony, Prince Oskar of Prussia christened the ship, which was named for the earlier armored frigate Grosser Kurfürst. Due to the heightening political tensions in Europe in mid-1914, the final construction work was accelerated, so the first set of dockyard trials were conducted on 15 July, and fitting-out work was completed by the 30th, the day she was commissioned into the High Seas Fleet. After her commissioning, she underwent sea trials in the Baltic. The ship's first combat operation was the Raid on Yarmouth on 2–3 November 1914. The raid was conducted by the battlecruisers of Rear Admiral Franz von Hipper's I Scouting Group. She and the other dreadnoughts sailed in distant support of Hipper's force. After a brief bombardment, the German fleet withdrew to port. On 7 December, she sustained no damage when she accidentally rammed her sister König.

Her second operation, the raid on Scarborough, Hartlepool and Whitby, followed on 15–16 December. On the evening of the 15th, the German battle fleet of some twelve dreadnoughts and eight pre-dreadnoughts came to within 10 nmi (19 km; 12 mi) of an isolated squadron of six British battleships. However, skirmishes between the rival destroyer screens in the darkness convinced Admiral Friedrich von Ingenohl, the fleet commander, that he was faced with the entire Grand Fleet. Under orders from Kaiser Wilhelm II to avoid risking the fleet unnecessarily, Ingenohl broke off the engagement and turned the battlefleet back toward Germany.

On 22 January 1915, she and the rest of III Squadron were detached from the fleet to conduct maneuver, gunnery, and torpedo training in the Baltic. They returned to the North Sea on 11 February, too late to assist I Scouting Group at the Battle of Dogger Bank. Following the loss of SMS Blücher at the Battle of Dogger Bank, the Kaiser removed Ingenohl from his post on 2 February. Admiral Hugo von Pohl replaced him as commander of the fleet. She then took part in several sorties into the North Sea. On 29 March, she sailed with the fleet out to Terschelling without any contact with the enemy. Another fleet advance occurred on 22 April, again without result. On 23 April, III Squadron returned to the Baltic for another round of exercises lasting until 10 May.

She participated in a fleet advance into the North Sea from 29 until 31 May which ended without combat. The ship covered a minelaying operation on 11–12 September off Texel. Another uneventful fleet advance followed on 23–24 October. She ended the year with a two-week training cruise in the Baltic, which lasted from 5 to 20 December. Another round of exercises in the Baltic followed on 18–23 January 1916. She went into drydock in Wilhelmshaven for periodic maintenance on 12 February. Work lasted until 3 March; two days later the ship sailed for a sweep into the Hoofden, though this again failed to encounter any British forces. The fleet conducted another sortie on 23 March to the Amrun Bank, followed by another a month later to Horns Reef on 21–22 April.

On 24–25 April, Hipper's battlecruisers conducted another bombardment of the English coast; Grosser Kurfürst and the rest of the High Seas Fleet sailed in support. The battlecruisers left the Jade Estuary at 10:55 CET, (Note: The times mentioned in this article are in CET, which is congruent with the German perspective. This is one hour ahead of UTC, the time zone commonly used in British works.) and the rest of the High Seas Fleet followed at 13:40. The battlecruiser Seydlitz struck a mine while en route to the target, and had to withdraw. The other battlecruisers bombarded the town of Lowestoft unopposed, but during the approach to Yarmouth, they encountered the British cruisers of the Harwich Force. A short artillery duel ensued before the Harwich Force withdrew. Reports of British submarines in the area prompted the retreat of I Scouting Group. At this point, Admiral Reinhard Scheer, who had been warned of the sortie of the Grand Fleet from its base in Scapa Flow, also withdrew to safer German waters.

=== Battle of Jutland ===
Maps showing the maneuvers of the British (blue) and German (red) fleets on 31 May – 1 June 1916

Grosser Kurfürst was present during the fleet operation on 31 May and 1 June 1916 that resulted in the Battle of Jutland. The German fleet again sought to draw out and isolate a portion of the Grand Fleet and destroy it before the main British fleet could retaliate. She was the second ship in the German line, behind her sister König and followed by Markgraf and Kronprinz. The four ships made up V Division of III Battle Squadron, and they were the vanguard of the fleet. III Battle Squadron was the first of three battleship units; directly astern were the Kaiser-class battleships of VI Division, III Battle Squadron. III Squadron was followed by the Helgoland and Nassau classes of I Battle Squadron; in the rear guard were the obsolescent Deutschland-class pre-dreadnoughts of II Battle Squadron.

Shortly before 16:00 the battlecruisers of I Scouting Group encountered the British 1st Battlecruiser Squadron under the command of David Beatty. The opposing ships began an artillery duel that resulted in the destruction of Indefatigable, shortly after 17:00, and Queen Mary less than half an hour later. By this time, the German battlecruisers were steaming south to draw the British ships toward the main body of the High Seas Fleet. At 17:30, König's crew spotted both I Scouting Group and the 1st Battlecruiser Squadron approaching. The German battlecruisers were steaming to starboard, while the British ships steamed to port. At 17:45, Scheer ordered a two-point turn to port to bring his ships closer to the British battlecruisers, and a minute later, the order to open fire was given. (Note: The compass can be divided into 32 points, each corresponding to 11.25 degrees. A two-point turn to port would alter the ships' course by 22.5 degrees.)

Grosser Kurfürst engaged the battlecruiser HMS Princess Royal at a range of 21,000 yd (19,000 m). Simultaneously, her secondary guns fired on British destroyers attempting to make torpedo attacks against the German fleet. (Note: V. E. Tarrant states that Nicator and Nestor launched four torpedoes against Grosser Kurfürst and König, though all four missed their targets. John Campbell, however, states that these two ships instead targeted Derfflinger and Lützow, and it was HMS Moorsom that fired the four torpedoes, though at Grosser Kurfürst and Markgraf. See: Tarrant, p. 114, and Campbell, pp. 55–56, respectively.) The faster British ships began to pull away from their pursuers, and at 18:00 she was forced to shift fire from Princess Royal to the battleship Valiant, though by 18:16 Valiant too had moved out of range. Her shells straddled Valiant four times and her gunners incorrectly claimed a hit on the British ship. The ship did not escape unscathed herself though; at 18:09 she was hit by a 15 in (380 mm) shell from either the battleships Malaya or Warspite. The shell struck the water some 30 to 60 ft (9.1 to 18.3 m) from the ship and either ricocheted or exploded, impacting the hull approximately 85 ft (26 m) from the bow. The hit caused no significant damage. During this period, she claimed three hits from her 15 cm battery on a destroyer, which was most likely Moorsom. At 18:22, the ship briefly fired her secondary guns at the destroyer HMS Moresby at extreme range, without scoring a hit. At the same time, Grosser Kurfürst came back into range of the battleship Valiant, and engaged her with her two forward turrets. The ship fired for eight minutes, though her shots all fell short of their target.

A König-class battleship firing her main guns at Jutland, by Claus Bergen

Shortly after 19:00, the German cruiser Wiesbaden had become disabled by a shell from the British battlecruiser Invincible; Rear Admiral Paul Behncke in König attempted to maneuver his four ships to cover the stricken cruiser. Simultaneously, the British 3rd and 4th Light Cruiser Squadrons began a torpedo attack on the German line; while advancing to torpedo range, they smothered Wiesbaden with fire from their main guns. Grosser Kurfürst and her sisters fired heavily on the British cruisers, but even sustained fire from the battleships' main guns failed to drive off the British cruisers. She fired a pair of salvos at extremely close range from her main guns at the armored cruiser Defence, which, under heavy fire from several German capital ships, exploded and sank at 19:19. Observers aboard the ship noted that both salvos hit Defence, though did not ascribe credit for the latter's destruction to the hits. She then shifted fire to the armored cruiser Warrior, which was heavily damaged and forced to withdraw. Warrior foundered on the trip back to port the following morning.

By 20:00, the German line was ordered to turn eastward to disengage from the British fleet, commanded by Admiral John Jellicoe. Shortly thereafter, four British light cruisers from the 2nd Light Cruiser Squadron resumed the attacks on the crippled Wiesbaden; the leading German battleships, including Grosser Kurfürst, opened fire on the cruisers in an attempt to drive them off. She began firing at 20:07, at ranges between 10,000 and 18,000 yd (9,100 and 16,500 m). Despite the heavy fire, the British cruisers managed to escape without serious damage. At around the same time, the British fleet came back into range and seven battleships took V Division under heavy fire. Grosser Kurfürst was hit seven times, four hits occurring at 20:18 and 20:19. Three of the hits were from the 13.5 in (34 cm) guns of Marlborough, though her gunners incorrectly claimed a fourth hit. The remaining four hits came from the 15-inch guns of Barham or Valiant. One of the 15-inch shells destroyed the No. 2 port-side 15 cm gun, and another struck the main belt and burst on impact. Though it did not penetrate the belt, it forced the plating in by as much as 13 in (33 cm) for a length of some 26 ft (7.9 m). Damage control teams managed to temporarily stop the resulting flooding, after approximately 800 t (790 long tons; 880 short tons) of water had entered the ship. The flooding caused a list of 4°, though counter-flooding efforts reduced it to less than a degree. As the battle continued, the flooding worsened, and by the time she reached Helgoland the following morning, an estimated 3,000 t (2,950 long tons; 3,310 short tons) of water had entered the ship. More hits were sustained, but these shells burst on impact and caused relatively minor damage.

Painting of a König-class ship under fire at Jutland by Claus Bergen

The heavy fire of the British fleet forced Scheer to order the fleet to turn away; this turn reversed the order of the fleet and placed her toward the end of the line. After successfully withdrawing from the British, Scheer ordered the fleet to assume night cruising formation, though communication errors between Scheer, aboard Friedrich der Grosse, and Westfalen, the lead ship, caused delays. The fleet fell into formation by 23:30, with Grosser Kurfürst the 15th vessel in the line of 24 capital ships. Around 02:45, several British destroyers mounted a torpedo attack against the rear half of the German line; she spotted six unidentified destroyers in the darkness. She engaged them with her 15 cm and 8.8 cm guns while turning away to avoid any torpedoes that might have been launched. She scored one 15 cm hit on the destroyer Nessus at a range of about 2,200 yd (2,000 m), disabling one of Nessus's boilers. Heavy fire from the German battleships forced the British destroyers to withdraw.

The High Seas Fleet managed to punch through the British light forces without drawing the attention of Jellicoe's battleships, and subsequently reached Horns Reef by 04:00 on 1 June. Off Helgoland, Grosser Kurfürst had taken in so much water that she was forced to reduce speed. She fell out of formation, but later rejoined the fleet outside the Schillig roadstead. Upon reaching Wilhelmshaven, she went into harbor while several other battleships took up defensive positions in the outer roadstead. The ship was transferred to Hamburg where she was repaired in AG Vulcan's large floating dock. Repair work was completed by 16 July. In the course of the battle, she fired a total of 135 shells from her main battery and 216 rounds from her 15 cm guns. She was hit by eight large-caliber shells, which killed fifteen men and wounded ten.

=== Subsequent operations ===
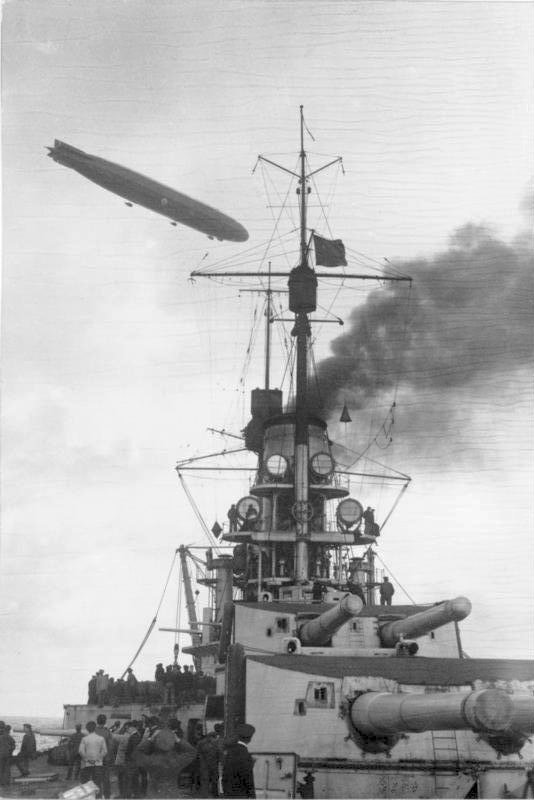
German battleship Grosser Kurfürst taken during Operation Albion in October 1917

Following completion of the repair work, Grosser Kurfürst conducted training maneuvers in the Baltic until 4 August. Admiral Scheer attempted a repeat of the original Jutland plan on 18–19 August. The battlecruiser squadron, however, had been reduced to only two operational ships—Von der Tann and Moltke—so Grosser Kurfürst, Markgraf, and the newly commissioned Bayern were temporarily transferred to the squadron. The British were aware of the German plans, and sortied the Grand Fleet to meet them. By 14:35, Scheer had been warned of the Grand Fleet's approach and, unwilling to engage the whole of the Grand Fleet just 11 weeks after the decidedly close call at Jutland, turned his forces around and retreated to German ports.

Unit training with III Squadron followed from 21 October to 2 November. Two days later, the ship formally rejoined III Squadron. On the 5th, a pair of U-boats grounded on the Danish coast. Light forces were sent to recover the vessels, and III Squadron, which was in the North Sea en route to Wilhelmshaven, was ordered to cover them. The British submarine J1 torpedoed Grosser Kurfürst some 30 nmi (56 km; 35 mi) northwest of Horns Reef. The torpedo destroyed the port-side rudder and flooded the rudder rooms, though the ship maintained a speed of 19 kn (35 km/h; 22 mph). She returned to the AG Vulcan dockyard, where she was repaired from 10 November to 9 February. That same day, while in transit to Kiel, the ship ran aground off Krautsand in the Elbe river. Damage was minimal and the ship proceeded to unit training in the Baltic, but on the return to the North Sea on 4 March, she accidentally rammed Kronprinz. Her bow was pushed in, necessitating repairs in the Imperial Dockyard in Wilhelmshaven until 22 April.

Grosser Kurfürst rejoined the fleet on 23 April and conducted training with the rest of III Squadron in the Baltic from 17 May to 8 June. After returning to the North Sea the ship was assigned to security duties in the German Bight. Another round of exercises in the Baltic followed on 11–23 September. She then sailed to Putziger Wiek to prepare for Operation Albion, the planned conquest of the islands off Riga. On 12 October, Grosser Kurfürst took up a position in Tagga Bay off Cape Ninnast. But she struck a mine while maneuvering into firing position, which allowed around 280 t (280 long tons; 310 short tons) of water into the ship. Despite the mine damage, the ship continued with the bombardment of Russian coastal guns on the Cape. She was detached from the invasion force later that day; she sailed to Wilhelmshaven via Kiel, where repairs were completed by 1 December.

Upon her return to service, Grosser Kurfürst resumed picket duties in the Bight. She was present during the abortive anti-convoy operation on 23–25 April 1918. While entering the lock outside Wilhelmshaven following the conclusion of the operation, the ship was damaged. She was back in dock for repairs from 27 April to 2 May. At the end of the month, Grosser Kurfürst ran aground just off the Helgoland's north harbor. The ship's port-side propeller shaft was bent, necessitating repairs at the Imperial Dockyard in Kiel from 2–9 June and 21–31 July. She finally rejoined the fleet on 12 August.

=== Fate ===
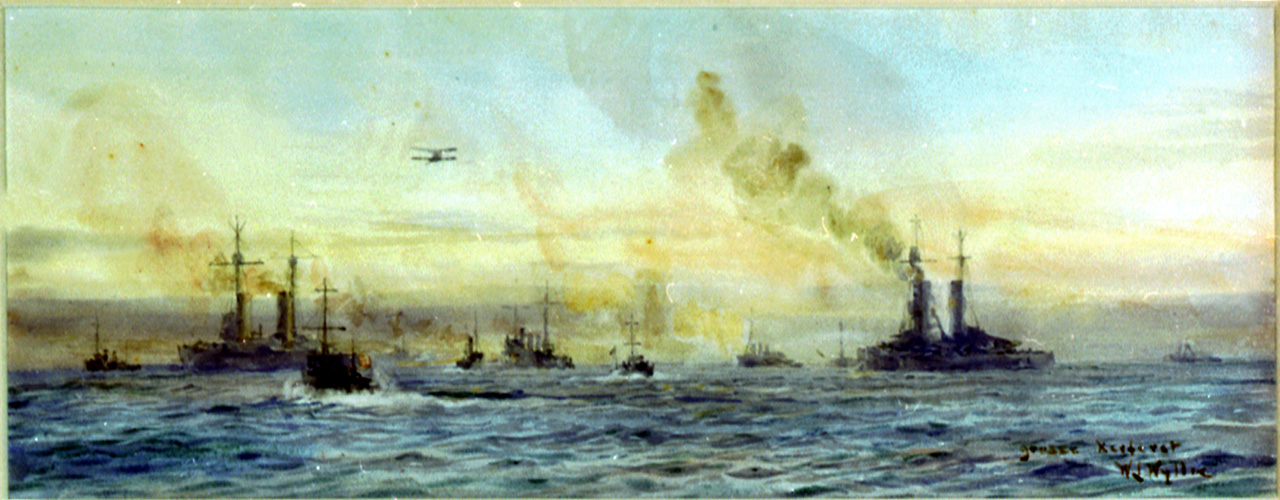
Painting of Grosser Kurfürst steaming to internment

A map of the scuttled ships, showing Grosser Kurfürst as#4

Grosser Kurfürst and her three sisters were to have taken part in a final fleet action at the end of October 1918, days before the Armistice was to take effect. The bulk of the High Seas Fleet was to have sortied from their base in Wilhelmshaven to engage the British Grand Fleet; Scheer—by now the Grand Admiral (Großadmiral) of the fleet—intended to inflict as much damage as possible on the British navy, in order to retain a better bargaining position for Germany, despite the expected casualties. However, many of the war-weary sailors felt the operation would disrupt the peace process and prolong the war. On the morning of 29 October 1918, the order was given to sail from Wilhelmshaven the following day. Starting on the night of 29 October, sailors on Thüringen and then on several other battleships mutinied. On the 31st, Scheer ordered the fleet dispersed; Grosser Kurfürst and the rest of III Squadron was sent to Kiel. On 4 November, the ship's crew joined the general mutiny and hoisted the red flag of the Socialists. The unrest ultimately forced Hipper and Scheer to cancel the operation. When informed of the situation, the Kaiser stated, "I no longer have a navy."

Following the capitulation of Germany in November 1918, most of the High Seas Fleet's ships, under the command of Rear Admiral Ludwig von Reuter, were interned in the British naval base in Scapa Flow. Prior to the departure of the German fleet, Admiral Adolf von Trotha made clear to Reuter that he could not allow the Allies to seize the ships, under any conditions. The fleet rendezvoused with the British light cruiser Cardiff, which led the ships to the Allied fleet that escorted the Germans to Scapa Flow. The massive flotilla consisted of some 370 British, American, and French warships. Once the ships were interned, their guns were disabled through the removal of their breech blocks, and their crews were reduced to 200 officers and men.

The fleet remained in captivity during the negotiations that ultimately produced the Versailles Treaty. Reuter believed that the British intended to seize the German ships on 21 June 1919, which was the deadline for Germany to have signed the peace treaty. Unaware that the deadline had been extended to the 23rd, Reuter ordered the ships to be sunk at the next opportunity. On the morning of 21 June, the British fleet left Scapa Flow to conduct training maneuvers, and at 11:20 Reuter transmitted the order to his ships. Grosser Kurfürst sank at 13:30; unlike her sisters, she was ultimately raised on 29 April 1938 and sold for scrapping in Rosyth. Her bell was sold and was used for many years as a garden ornament. It was sold at auction in March 2014 and was bought by the National Museum of the Royal Navy, Portsmouth, Hampshire.
