= Mackerel (disambiguation) =

Mackerel may refer to:

- Mackerel, any of a number of different species of fish
  - Mackerel as food
- Mackerel sky, a formation of altocumulus clouds
- Mackerel, a type of Tabby cat
- Great Mackerel Beach, NSW, Australia
- Mackerel Islets, two small islands off eastern Tasmania, Australia
- HMS Mackerel, the name of three ships of the Royal Navy
- USS Mackerel, the name of two submarines of the U.S. Navy
