= Mayfly (disambiguation) =

A mayfly is a type of insect belonging to the order Ephemeroptera.

Mayfly or Mayflies may also refer to:

== Music ==
- Mayfly, an album by Cy Curnin
- "Mayfly", a song by Belle and Sebastian from If You're Feeling Sinister
- Mayfly (band), an American Christian metal band from Ohio
- The Mayflies USA, an American power pop band

== Film, television, literature ==
- Mayfly (film), a 2008 short film
- Mayflies (TV series), a 2022 two-part television drama
- Mayflies (novel), a novel by Kevin O'Donnell Jr.
- Mayflies, a novel by Andrew O'Hagan

== Transportation ==
- HMA No. 1 or Mayfly, a British Royal Navy airship
- HMS Mayfly, several British Royal Navy ships
- Bland Mayfly, an early aircraft constructed in 1910 by Lilian E. Bland
- Halton Mayfly, a British two-seat biplane designed by C.H. Latimer-Needham in the 1920s
- Southend MPG Mayfly, a British two-seat human-powered aircraft, built in the 1960s
