= SS Mona's Isle =

SS Mona's Isle is the name of the following ships:

- SS Mona's Isle (1830)
- SS Mona's Isle (1860)
- SS Mona's Isle (1882)
- SS Mona's Isle (1905)
- SS Mona's Isle (1950)

== See also ==
- Mona's Isle (disambiguation)
