= Mersey (ship) =

Mersey (ship) may refer to:

- Mersey (1805 ship), a ship wrecked off Torres Strait, Australia in 1805
- Mersey (1894 ship), a former Nourse Line and White Star Line vessel; scrapped in 1923
- SS Mersey, a freight vessel built for the Lancashire and Yorkshire Railway; sunk by mine in 1940

== See also ==
- HMS Mersey, Royal Navy ships named "Mersey"
