= HMS Sharpshooter =

Five ships of the Royal Navy have been named Sharpshooter (or Sharp Shooter).

- HMS Sharpshooter (1805) was a 12-gun brig launched in 1805. She was sold in 1816.
- HMS Sharpshooter (1846) was an iron screw gunvessel launched in 1846. She was sold in 1869.
- HMS Sharpshooter (1888) was a Sharpshooter-class torpedo gunboat launched in 1888. In 1912 she was renamed Northampton and reduced to harbour service. Sold in 1922 and broken up.
- HMS Sharpshooter (1917) was an R-class destroyer launched in 1917 and scrapped in 1927.
- HMS Sharpshooter (J68) was a Halcyon-class minesweeper launched in 1936. Converted to a survey ship and renamed Shackleton in 1953 she was scrapped in 1965.
