= Nessus =

Nessus may refer to:

== Mythology ==
- Nessus (mythology), multiple figures from Greek mythology, including:
  - Nessus (centaur), a centaur who caused the death of Heracles

== Fiction ==
- Nessus (Pierson's Puppeteer), an alien character in Larry Niven's Known Space books
- Nessus, a fictional metropolis in Gene Wolfe's The Book of the New Sun
- Nessus, a layer of Hell (Baator) in the Dungeons & Dragons tabletop game
- Nessus, one of the moons of the fictional planet Chiron in the computer game Sid Meier's Alpha Centauri
- Nessus, a planetoid location in the video game Destiny 2, based on the below Centaur

== Science and technology ==
- 7066 Nessus, a Centaur planetoid
- Nessus (software), a computer security tool
- Nessus (Blackberry), the proprietary kernel all Blackberry before BlackBerry 10 were based upon
- NESSUS Probabilistic Analysis Software, a tool for assessing uncertainties in structural and mechanical systems
- Nessus sphinx or Amphion floridensis, a moth found in North America

== Other uses ==
- HMS Nessus, two vessels of the Royal Navy (UK)
