= HMS Newport =

Four ships of the Royal Navy have borne the name HMS Newport after the Welsh city of Newport:

- HMS Newport (1694) was a 24-gun sixth rate captured by the French in 1694.
- HMS Newport was a 24-gun sixth rate launched in 1695 as HMS Orford. She was renamed HMS Newport in 1698 and was sold in 1718.
- HMS Newport (1867) was a Philomel-class wooden screw gunvessel launched in 1867 and completed in 1868 as a survey vessel. She was sold into civilian service in 1881 and was renamed Pandora.
- HMS Newport (G54) was a Town-class destroyer transferred from the United States Navy in 1940. She was lent to the Royal Norwegian Navy between 1941 and 1942 and then became an aircraft target ship in 1943. She was sold for scrapping in 1947.
