= Mediator (disambiguation) =

Mediator is a person who engages in mediation.

It may also refer to:

- Business mediator, a mediator in business
- Vanishing mediator, a philosophical concept
- Mediator variable, in statistics

== Chemistry and biology ==
- Mediator (coactivator), a multiprotein complex that functions as a transcriptional coactivator
- Endogenous mediator, proteins that enhance and activate the functions of other proteins
- Gaseous mediator, chemicals produced by some cells that have biological signalling functions
- Mediator, a brand name of benfluorex, a withdrawn anorectic and hypolipidemic medication

== Internet, software, and computer ==
- Mediator pattern, in computer science
- A mail server's role in email forwarding

== Other ==
- Mediator, guitar pick or plectrum, an accessory for picking strings of musical instruments
- Mediator (TV series), a Russian television series
- The Mediator, a teen book series by Meg Cabot (some under the pseudonym Jenny Carroll)
- The Mediator, a television documentary produced by Open Media
- Mediator (Christ as Mediator), an office of Jesus Christ
- Linesman/Mediator, a radar system in the United Kingdom
- HMS Mediator, three ships of the British navy
- USS Mediator, a ship of the United States navy
- "Mediator", a song by Jinjer from Wallflowers (album)
