= K144 =

K144 or K-144 may refer to:

- K-144 (Kansas highway), a state highway in Kansas
- HMS Meadowsweet (K144), a former UK Royal Navy ship
