= HMS Moorsom =

HMS Moorsom may refer to more than one ship of the British Royal Navy:

- HMS Moorsom (1914), an Admiralty M-class destroyer launched in 1914 and sold in 1921
- HMS Moorsom (K567), a Captain-class frigate in commission from 1943 to 1945
