= Matchless (disambiguation) =

Matchless was a British motorcycle manufacturer from 1899 to 1966, with phased final-sales ending by 1970.

Matchless may also refer to:

== Entertainment ==
- Matchless (film), a 1967 Italian science fiction comedy
- Matchless Raijin-Oh, a Japanese anime television series (1991–1992)

== Places ==
- Matchless Mountain (Antarctica), a mountain in Antarctica
- Matchless Mountain (Colorado), a mountain in the U.S. state of Colorado

== Ships ==
- HMS Matchless, two ships of the Royal Navy
- USC&GS Matchless, a ship of the United States Coast and Geodetic Survey (1885–1919)
- Matchless (pleasure yacht), a vessel that sank in 1894 in Morecambe Bay, England
- Matchless, a schooner that rescued four crewmen of the capsized Canadian schooner Codseeker in 1877

== Other uses ==
- Matchless Amplifiers, an American guitar amplifier company
- Matchless Mine, a historic mine located in Lake County, Colorado, United States
- Matchless Mine, Namibia, a copper mine in Khomas Region, Namibia
