= French ship Magnanime =

Several ships of the French Navy have borne the name Magnanime:

- Magnanime (1673), an 80-gun ship of the line, launched in 1673, and sunk during the Battle of Cabrita Point on 21 March 1705.
- Magnanime (1706), a 72-gun ship, launched in 1706, and wrecked in 1712.
- Magnanime (1744), a 74-gun ship, launched in 1744, and captured by the British in 1748, and broken up in 1775.
- Magnanime (1779), a 74-gun ship, launched in 1779, and broken up in 1793.
- Magnanime, a 74-gun ship laid down in 1794, but renamed Quatorze Juillet in 1798, and finally launched as Vétéran in 1803.
- Magnanime (1803), 74-gun ship of the line launched in 1803, and laid up in 1816.

== See also ==
- HMS Magnanime
