= HMS Messenger =

Three vessels of the Royal Navy have been named HMS Messenger:

- HMS Messenger (1672) was a Dutch 6-gun dogger captured in 1672 and sold in 1673
- HMS Messenger (1694) was a 6-gun advice boat built in 1694 and foundered in the Atlantic in 1701
- HMS Messenger (1830) was the paddle vessel Duke of York, purchased in 1830 and sold in 1861
