= HMS Nestor =

Three ships of the Royal Navy have borne the name HMS Nestor, after Nestor, a figure in Greek mythology:

- HMS Nestor (1781), a 28-gun sixth rate, formerly the French privateer Franklin, of Dunkirk. Franklin was under the command of an American captain, Bennet Negus, and cruised between April and June 1781, taking several prizes, before Ramillies and Ulysses captured her; she was sold in 1783.
- HMS Nestor (1915), an Admiralty M-class destroyer launched in 1915 and sunk during the Battle of Jutland in 1916.
- HMAS Nestor (G02), an N-class destroyer launched in 1940. She was used by the Royal Australian Navy though she remained British property. She was sunk in 1942.
