= HMS Middleton =

Two ships of the Royal Navy have been named HMS Middleton after the Middleton hunt:

- HMS Middleton (L74), launched in 1941, was a Type II Hunt-class destroyer. She served in World War II and was scrapped in 1958.
- HMS Middleton (M34), launched in 1983, is a Hunt-class mine countermeasures vessel.

In addition, one ship has carried the name HMS Lord Middleton:

- HMS Lord Middleton (FY219), was a requisitioned naval trawler which served in the Second World War. She was taken over by the Admiralty in 1939 and returned to her original owners in 1945.

Another ship was known as RFA Robert Middleton:

- RFA Robert Middleton (A241), was a Dundas-class coastal stores carrier of the Royal Fleet Auxiliary.
