= Cook Musfly =

1970s British two-seat human-powered aircraft

- Cook Musfly

General information
- Type: Human-powered aircraft
- National origin: United Kingdom
- Manufacturer: David Cook
- Status: not flown, scrapped
- Number built: 1

The Musfly was a British two-seat human-powered tailless aircraft built by David Cook in the 1970s.

== Background ==
Intended to win the Kremer prize, the Musfly was designed by David Cook and Neil Moran, who at the time were employees at Richard Garrett & Sons, at Leiston, in Suffolk. The aircraft was a wire-braced high-wing tailless monoplane. The wing planform was made up of a central constant-chord swept wing, with anhedral wing-tips. "Draggons" (upward deflecting ailerons) fitted to the wing-tips would provide lateral and directional control. Pitch control would be by weight shift, with the crewed capsule, suspended beneath the wing, being moved back and forth.

In the capsule, the two-person crew would operate treadles in order to power a pusher propeller, which was to be positioned slightly below and behind the wing. The pilot would operate leg treadles, while the second crew member would use both arm and leg treadles. It was believed this arrangement would generate more power, with longer power strokes, than would be possible with a conventional pedal arrangement. Moran believed that the Musfly would fly with the crew generating 0.8 hp (0.6 kW).

The aircraft was built by Cook, with assistance from co-designer Moran, Chris Tansley, Terry Aspinall, Bob Jelliff, Brian Pattenden, and others, with the primary airframe being completed by September 1977. Work on the aircraft continued till at least 1979, and was nearing completion when Cook lost use of the building that it was being housed in. That development prompted the end of the project, and the airframe was then scrapped.

== Specifications ==
Data from Flying from my mind

General characteristics

- Crew: 2
- Wingspan: 70 ft (21 m)
- Airfoil: Lissaman 7769
- Empty weight: 90 lb (41 kg)
- Propellers: 2-bladed, 11 ft (3.4 m) diameter

Performance

- Cruise speed: 12 mph (19 km/h, 10 kn)
- Lift-to-drag: 26:1

== See also ==
Aircraft of comparable role, configuration, and era

- HPA Toucan
- Goodhart Newbury Manflier
- MacCready Gossamer Albatross
- MacCready Gossamer Condor
- Southend MPG Mayfly

Related lists

- List of Human-powered aircraft
