= HMS Grace (1794) =

British naval barge 1794–1798

History

Great Britain
- Name: HMS Grace
- Acquired: By purchase under Admiralty order 3 February 1794
- Fate: Sold 1798

General characteristics
- Type: River barge
- Tons burthen: 69 (bm)
- Length: 57 ft 1 1/2 in (17.412 m) (overall); 46 ft 7 1/4 in (14.2 m) (keel)
- Beam: 16 ft 9 1/4 in (5.112 m)
- Depth of hold: 4 ft 11 in (1.50 m)
- Complement: 60
- Armament: 2 × 18-pounder guns + 1 × 32-pounder carronade

HMS Grace was one of 11 Thames sailing barges that the Admiralty purchased in 1794, for the British Royal Navy. After the outbreak of the French Revolutionary Wars in 1793, the Navy had found itself without vessels capable of inshore work and riverine operations. In 1795, the Admiralty started to order purpose-built schooner or brigantine-rigged gun vessels.

Mr. G. Garnault commissioned Grace in October 1796. His replacement was Mr. W. Goodall. In June 1798, Mr. Edward Dawson took command.

On 10 July, Dawson and Mr. John Matthew Miller, master of New Betsey, dined together on New Betsey, together with their families and other non-commissioned officers, while both barges were at Sheerness. The meal included the imbibing of much wine, and a disagreement developed between Miller and Dawson. Dawson left New Betsey and landed on the beach. When Miller stepped out of a boat to help the ladies disembark, Dawson came up and using his hanger, stabbed Miller, killing him. Dawson's trial took place 25 July, at Maidstone, where the jury quickly found him guilty of murder. Dawson was hanged on 27 July, on Penenden Heath.

The "Principal Officers and Commissioners of His Majesty's Navy" offered Grace, of 69 tons (bm), for sale on 24 October 1798. She sold then.
