= HMS Mona's Isle =

Two ships of the Royal Navy have borne the name HMS Mona's Isle; they are named for the Isle of Man.

- HMS Mona's Isle (1915), a Manx paddle steamer purchased by the Royal Navy in the First World War
- HMS Mona's Isle (1939), a Manx packet requisitioned by the Royal Navy in the Second World War

== Sources ==
Colledge, J. J.; Warlow, Ben (2006) [1969]. Ships of the Royal Navy: The Complete Record of All Fighting Ships of the Royal Navy from the 15th Century to the Present (3rd Rev ed.). London: Chatham Publishing. ISBN 978-1-86176-281-8. OCLC 67375475.

== See also ==
- Mona's Isle (disambiguation)
