= HMS Mullett =

At least four vessels of the Royal Navy have borne the name HMS Mullett, Mullet, or Mulette.

- HMS Mulette (1793) or Mullet was the French Dromadaire-class Mulet, launched c. May 1782 based on plans by Jean-Joseph Ginoux, originally classed as a barge and then as a flûte (1784). She was armed with eighteen to twenty 6 or 8-pounder guns. The British captured her at Toulon in 1793 and commissioned her as the sloop Mulette (or Mullet). She was broken up in 1796.
- HMS Mullett (1807) was a Ballahoo-class schooner that was built in Bermuda and launched in 1807. She was sold in 1814.
- HMS Mullett (1860) was a Philomel-class wooden screw gunvessel launched in 1860, sold on 25 April 1872 at Hong Kong for mercantile use and renamed Formosa.
- HMS Mullett (T331) was a Fish-class ASW trawler launched in 1942 and sold in 1946.

== See also ==
- Mullett (1813 ship), an American vessel taken as a prize of war

== Sources ==
- Colledge, J. J.; Warlow, Ben (2006) [1969]. Ships of the Royal Navy: The Complete Record of All Fighting Ships of the Royal Navy from the 15th Century to the Present (3rd Rev ed.). London: Chatham Publishing. ISBN 978-1-86176-281-8. OCLC 67375475.
- Demerliac, Alain (1996). La Marine de la Révolution: Nomenclature des Navires Français de 1794 à 1792 (in French). Éditions Ancre. ISBN 2-906381-23-3.
- Winfield, Rif (2008). British Warships in the Age of Sail 1793–1817: Design, Construction, Careers and Fates. Seaforth. ISBN 978-1-86176-246-7.
