= HMS Marigold =

Six ships of the British Royal Navy have been named HMS Marigold, after the marigold flower:

- Marigold, a 22-gun ship captured from the Portuguese in 1650 and sold 1658
- Marigold, a 3-gun hoy, a 42-ton vessel built at Portsmouth Dockyard in 1653 and broken up in 1712
- HMS Marigold (1673), a 4-gun fireship purchased in 1673 and lost in action in August of that year
- HMS Marigold (1677), a 44-gun fourth rate captured from Algeria in 1677 and wrecked 1679
- HMS Marigold (1915), an Acacia-class sloop launched in 1915 and sold 1920
- HMS Marigold (K87), a Flower-class corvette launched in 1940 and sunk December 1942
