= HMS Mosquito =

Twelve ships of the Royal Navy have borne the name HMS Mosquito, or the archaic HMS Musquito, after the tropical insect, the Mosquito:

- HMS Musquito (1777) was a vessel in service in 1777.
- HMS Musquito (1794) was a 6-gun schooner, previously the French privateer Venus. She was captured in 1793, purchased by the Navy in 1794, and paid off in 1796.
- HMS Musquito was the name vessel for the two-vessel Musquito class of floating batteries; she was launched in 1794 but wrecked in June 1795.
- HMS Musquito (1798) was a 16-gun ship-sloop, previously the French privateer Petite Magicienne. She was captured by three Spanish frigates in September 1798.
- HMS Musquito (1799) or Muskito was a 12-gun schooner captured from the French in 1799 and sold in 1802.
- HMS Musquito (1804) was a Cruizer-class brig-sloop launched in 1804 and sold in 1822.
- HMS Musquito (1825) was a Cherokee-class brig-sloop launched in 1825 and sold in 1843.
- HMS Musquito (1851) was a 16-gun Helena-class brig launched in 1851 and sold to the Prussian Navy in 1862.
- HMS Mosquito (1871) was a composite Ariel-class gunboat launched in 1871 and sold in 1888.
- HMS Mosquito (1890) was a paddle river gunboat launched in 1890 and sold in 1902.
- HMS Mosquito (1910) was a Beagle-class destroyer launched in 1910 and sold in 1920.
- HMS Mosquito (T94) was a Dragonfly-class river gunboat launched in 1939 and sunk in 1940.
- HMS Mosquito (shore establishment) was a naval base in Alexandria, Egypt during World War II

== See also ==
- HMQS Mosquito was a torpedo boat launched in 1884. She served in the Queensland Maritime Defence Force and (after federation) the Commonwealth Naval Forces and was sold in 1912.
