= HMS Nigella =

Two ships of the Royal Navy have been named HMS Nigella :

- HMS Nigella (1915) an Arabis-class sloop launched in 1915 and sold in 1922.
- HMS Nigella (K19) a Flower-class corvette launched in 1940 and sold in 1947 for mercantile service as Nigelock. She sank in 1955.
