= HMS Nonpareil =

Four ships of the Royal Navy have borne the name HMS Nonpareil, from the French meaning 'without equal':

- English ship Nonpareil (1584) was a 56-gun galleon, launched in 1556 as the 44-gun HMS Philip and Mary. She was rebuilt in 1584 and renamed Nonpareil. She was again rebuilt in 1603 and renamed Nonsuch. She was sold in 1645.
- The frigate HMS NonPareil was captured on May 12, 1741, by Juan José Navarro's Spanish fleet near the Isles of Scilly and taken to Ferrol. She departed in convoy to La Guaria and Cartagena de Indias. From there, she joined Rodrigo de Torres's fleet in Havana.
- HMS Nonpareil (1808) was a schooner launched at Baltimore in 1801 that the Royal Navy captured in 1808 and purchased. She was damaged in a storm in 1812 and sold the following year.
- HMS Nonpareil (1916) was an Admiralty M-class destroyer launched in 1916 and sold in 1921.
- HMS Nonpareil (G16) was an N-class destroyer launched in 1941. She was transferred to the Royal Netherlands Navy in 1942 and renamed Tjerk Hiddes. She was transferred to Indonesia in 1951 and renamed Gadjah Mada. She was broken up in 1961.
- HMS Nonpareil was to have been an Algerine-class minesweeper. She was laid down in 1944 but cancelled later that year.
