= HMS Morgiana =

Two vessels of the Royal Navy have been named HMS Morgiana:

- HMS Morgiana (1800) was a 16-gun brig-sloop, previously the French privateer Actif captured in 1800, broken up in 1811
- HMS Morgiana (1811) was an 18-gun Bermuda-class ship-sloop, commissioned in 1811 and sold in 1825
