= HMS Muros =

Two vessels of the Royal Navy have been named HMS Muros for Muros:

- HMS Muros (1806) was the French privateer Alcide, launched at Bordeaux in 1804. The Royal Navy captured her in 1806, renamed her, and commissioned her. She wrecked in March 1808.
- HMS Muros (1809) was a Crocus-class brig-sloop launched in 1809 at Chatham Dockyard. She had a relatively uneventful career though she did participate in one major campaign. She was sold in 1822 for breaking up.
