= HMS Mallow =

HMS Mallow has been the name of more than one ship of the British Royal Navy, and may refer to:

- HMS Mallow (1915), an Acacia-class sloop launched in 1915, transferred to the Royal Australian Navy as HMAS Mallow in 1919, decommissioned in 1925, and sunk as a target in 1935
- HMS Mallow (K81), a Flower-class corvette launched in 1940, transferred to the Yugoslav Navy as Nada in 1944, renamed Partizanka in 1946, returned to the Royal Navy in 1948, sold to the Egyptian Navy in 1948 and renamed El Sudan, and deleted from the Egyptian Navy list in 1982.
