= HMS Minstrel =

Five ships of the Royal Navy have been named HMS Minstrel after the medieval European entertainer Minstrel:

- HMS Minstrel (1807) launched in 1807 and sold in 1817
- HMS Minstrel (1865) a Britomart-class gunboat launched in 1865
- HMS Minstrel (1911) an Acorn-class destroyer launched in 1911
- HMS Minstrel (J445) an Algerine-class minesweeper launched in 1944, she was sold to Thailand in 1947 and renamed Phosampton. Preserved as a museum ship
- HMS Minstrel (1962) a M-class minelayer launched as M.I in 1939, renamed Miner I in 1942 and Minstrel in 1962. She was sold in 1967
