= HMS Minos =

Two ships of the Royal Navy have been named HMS Minos, after the Minos of Greek mythology.

- The first HMS Minos (1840) was an early steam vessel, operating on the Great Lakes from 1840 to 1852.
- The second HMS Minos (1914) was an Admiralty M-class destroyer in service from 1914 to 1920.

In the Second World War, HMS Minos was a shore base at the Port of Lowestoft.
