= HMS Napier =

Three ships of the British Royal Navy have been named HMS Napier, in honor of Admiral Charles Napier.

- The first Napier was a 445-ton iron river gunboat built at Bombay Dockyard, launched 11 September 1844, and in the records until 1858.
- The second HMS Napier (1916) was an Admiralty M-class destroyer launched in 1916 and sold in 1921.
- The third HMS Napier (G97) was an N-class destroyer launched in 1940 and loaned to the Royal Australian Navy during World War II. She was broken up in 1956.
