= HMS Maenad =

Two ships of the Royal Navy have borne the name HMS Maenad, after the maenads, female followers of Dionysus in Greek mythology:

- HMS Maenad (1915) was an Admiralty M-class destroyer launched in 1915 and sold in 1921.
- HMS Maenad (J335) was an Algerine-class minesweeper launched in 1944 and scrapped in 1957.
