= HMS Moorsom (K567) =

Frigate of the Royal Navy

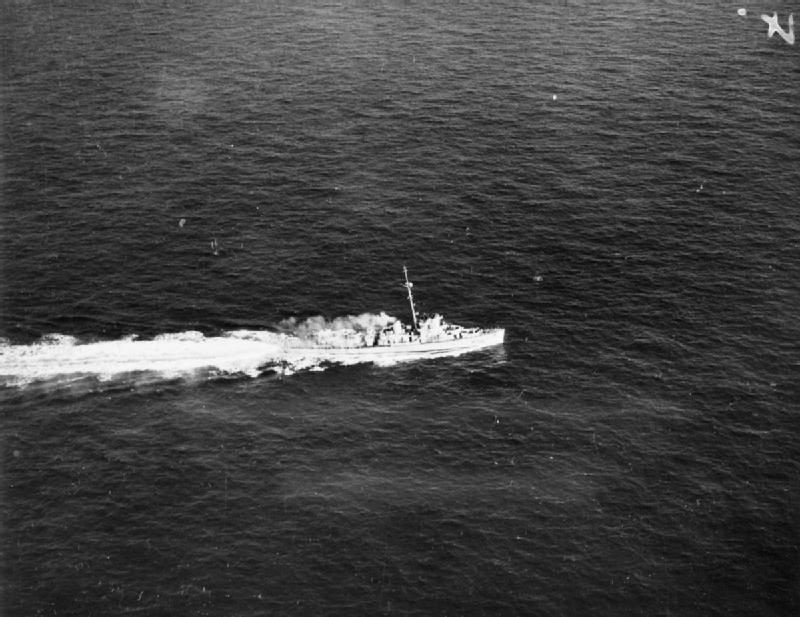
- HMS Moorsom during World War II

History

United States
- Name: unnamed (DE-522)
- Builder: Boston Navy Yard, Boston, Massachusetts
- Laid down: 14 August 1943
- Launched: 24 September 1943
- Completed: 10 December 1943
- Commissioned: never
- Fate: Transferred to United Kingdom, 10 December 1943
- Acquired: Returned by United Kingdom, 25 October 1945
- Stricken: 5 December 1945
- Fate: Sold for scrap; Scrapping completed 12 July 1946

United Kingdom
- Name: HMS Moorsom (K567)
- Namesake: Admiral Sir Robert Moorsom
- Acquired: 10 December 1943
- Commissioned: 10 December 1943
- Decommissioned: 25 October 1945
- Identification: Pennant number: K567
- Fate: Returned to United States, 25 October 1945

General characteristics
- Displacement: 1,190 long tons (1,210 t) (standard)
- Length: 289 ft 5 in (88.2 m)
- Beam: 35 ft 2 in (10.7 m)
- Draught: 10 ft 1 in (3.1 m)
- Installed power: 6,000 shp (4,500 kW) electric motors
- Propulsion: 2 shafts; 4 diesel engines
- Speed: 20 knots (37 km/h; 23 mph)
- Range: 6,000 nmi (11,000 km; 6,900 mi) at 12 knots (22 km/h; 14 mph)
- Complement: 198
- Sensors & processing systems: SA & SL type radars; Type 144 series Asdic; MF Direction Finding; HF Direction Finding
- Armament: 3 × single 3 in (76 mm)/50 Mk 22 guns; 1 × twin Bofors 40 mm; 9 × single 20 mm Oerlikon guns; 1 × Hedgehog anti-submarine mortar; 2 × Depth charge rails and four throwers

The second HMS Moorsom (K567) was a British Captain-class frigate of the Royal Navy in commission during World War II. Originally constructed as the United States Navy Evarts-class destroyer escort DE-522, she served in the Royal Navy from 1943 to 1945.

== Description ==
The Evarts-class ships had an overall length of 289 feet 5 inches (88.2 m), a beam of 35 feet 2 inches (10.7 m), and a draught of 10 feet 1 inch (3.1 m) at full load. They displaced 1,190 long tons (1,210 t) at (standard) and 1,416 long tons (1,439 t) at full load. The ships had a diesel–electric powertrain derived from a submarine propulsion system with four General Motors 16-cylinder diesel engines providing power to four General Electric electric generators which sent electricity to four 1,500-shaft-horsepower (1,100 kW) General Electric electric motors which drove the two propeller shafts. The destroyer escorts had enough power give them a speed of 20 knots (37 km/h; 23 mph) and enough fuel oil to give them a range of 6,000 nautical miles (11,000 km; 6,900 mi) at 12 knots (22 km/h; 14 mph). Their crew consisted of 198 officers and ratings.

The armament of the Evarts-class ships in British service consisted of three single mounts for 50-caliber 3-inch (76 mm)/50 Mk 22 dual-purpose guns; one superfiring pair forward of the bridge and the third gun aft of the superstructure. Anti-aircraft defence was intended to consisted of a twin-gun mount for 40-millimetre (1.6 in) Bofors anti-aircraft (AA) guns atop the rear superstructure with nine 20-millimetre (0.8 in) Oerlikon AA guns located on the superstructure, but production shortages meant that that not all guns were fitted, or that additional Oerlikons replaced the Bofors guns. A Mark 10 Hedgehog anti-submarine mortar was positioned just behind the forward gun. The ships were also equipped with two depth charge rails at the stern and four "K-gun" depth charge throwers.

== Construction and career ==
The ship was laid down as the unnamed U.S. Navy destroyer escort DE-522 by the Boston Navy Yard in Boston, Massachusetts, on 14 August 1943 and launched on 24 September 1943. The United States transferred her to the United Kingdom under Lend-Lease on 10 December 1943. The ship was commissioned into service in the Royal Navy as HMS Moorsom (K567) on 10 December 1943 simultaneously with her transfer. She served on convoy escort duty in the North Atlantic Ocean and the North Sea for the remainder of World War II. In addition, she supported the Allied invasion of Normandy in the summer of 1944.

After the conclusion of the war, Moorsom steamed to New York City, arriving there on 16 October 1945. The Royal Navy decommissioned her there on 25 October 1945 and returned her to the U.S. Navy the same day. After her return, Moorsom remained in the 3rd Naval District. The U.S. Navy struck her from its Naval Vessel Register on 5 December 1945 and soon sold her for scrap, which was completed on 12 July 1946.
