= HMS Messenger (1830) =

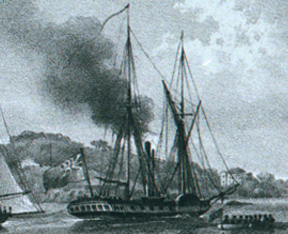

History

United Kingdom
- Name: HMS Messenger
- In service: 1830
- Fate: Converted to coal depot 1840; Broken up 1861

General characteristics
- Displacement: 912 long tons (927 t)
- Tons burthen: 733 44/94 (bm) initially; 759 33/94 after lengthening
- Length: 155 ft 6 in (47.4 m); 133 ft 4 in (40.6 m) (keel); 159 ft 0 in (48.5 m) (after lengthening); 137 ft 3 1/4 in (41.8 m) (keel after lengthening)
- Beam: 32 ft 9 in (10.0 m); 32 ft 3 in (9.8 m) (for tonnage)
- Draught: 10 ft 3 in (3.1 m) (forward); 10 ft 9 in (3.3 m) (aft)
- Installed power: 2-cylinder side-lever 80 nhp (originally); 2x Maudslay, Sons and Field engines 200 nhp total (after lengthening)
- Propulsion: 2-cylinder side lever engines; Side paddles
- Speed: 8.8 mph (7.6 kn; 14.2 km/h)
- Armament: 1 × 12-pounder carronade

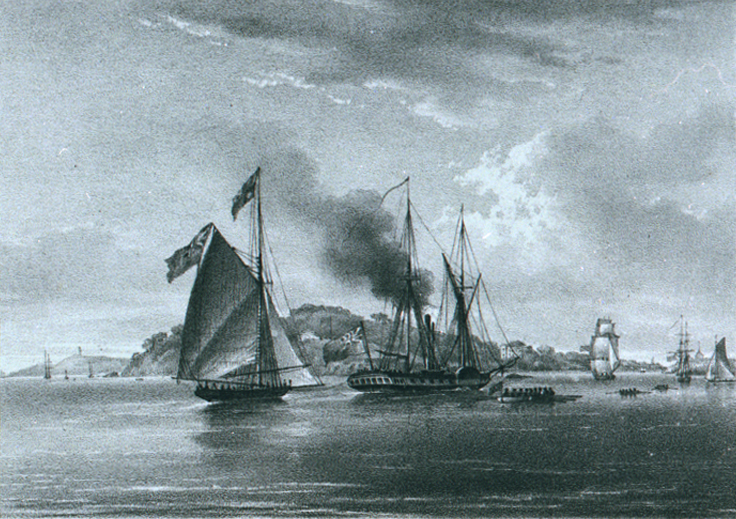
The Arrival of Their Royal Highnesses The Duchess of Kent and the Princess Victoria on board the Emerald, tender to the RY Royal George, towed by the Messenger. in Plymouth Sound, 2 August 1835

HMS Messenger was a wooden paddle ship, built in 1824 by Benjamin Wallis at Blackwall as Duke of York, and renamed Messenger when purchased by the Royal Navy on 20 August 1830 for £12,481. Initially she was rated as a paddle packet. In 1831, she was re-engined and lengthened by 31/2 feet (4.7 m) at a cost of £12,560. At around this time she was re-rated as a sloop. She passed Gibraltar in 1830, according to Earl of Beaconsfield's letters en route to Cadiz, Spain. It was reported Benjamin Disraeli was on the boat. She was fitted as a coal depot from May–December 1840, and sold to Henry Castle & Son to be broken up on 22 November 1861.

Her sister ship, George IV, was also purchased by the Royal Navy for a total cost (including Messenger) of £24,977 9s. 4d., and renamed Hermes.

== Propulsion ==
The paddle wheels were 20 feet (6.1 m) in diameter and 10 feet (3.0 m) wide. After her lengthening, she was re-engined with 2 engines of 100 nominal horse power each. Her cylinders were 52 3/8 inches (1.33 m) in diameter, with a 5 foot (1.5 m) stroke. She obtained a speed of 8.8 miles per hour (14.2 km/h) on trials with 150 short tons (140 t) of fuel loaded. Fuel consumption was about 16 long hundredweight (810 kg) of coal per hour at an average speed of 5 1/2 knots (10.2 km/h). Her fuel capacity was 240 long tons (240 t) of coal, and with this load her displacement was 935 long tons (950 t).

== Commissions ==
- 1830: under Lieutenant William Frederick Lapidge
- 20 May 1830: under Lieutenant Benjamin Aplin, as a Falmouth packet
- May 1834: under John King as a transport
- 27 July 1840: as a coal depot
