= HMS Musette =

Two ships of the Royal Navy have been named HMS Musette:

- HMS Musette (1796), formerly French ship Musette (1781), captured in 1796 by HMS Hazard. Sold in 1806.
- HMS Musette (1807), formerly French brig Phaeton (1804), captured in 1806 and renamed HMS Mignonne, then in 1807 renamed HMS Musette. She was sold in 1814.
