= HMS Nith =

Two ships have borne the name HMS Nith.

- HMS Nith (1905) was a River-class destroyer launched in 1905 and broken up in 1919.
- HMS Nith (K215) was a River-class frigate launched in 1942. She was sold to Egypt in 1948 and renamed Domiat. She was sunk in 1956.
