= HMS Milbrook =

Three vessels of the Royal Navy have borne the name HMS Milbrook (or Millbrook), possibly named for Millbrook, Southampton, near the shipyard on the River Test in which the first Milbrook was built:

- HMS Milbrook (1798), a schooner built to an experimental design by Samuel Bentham and launched 1798. Wrecked 1808.
- HMS Milbrook (1915), an Admiralty M-class destroyer built by Thornycroft, begun November 1914, launched 12 July 1915, and completed October 1915. Sold for breaking up 22 September 1921.
- HMS Millbrook (1982), a fleet tender used for seamanship training. Day running out of Devonport, the ship took classes of junior sailors from the training establishment HMS Raleigh.
