= HMS Malacca =

Two ships of the Royal Navy have borne the name HMS Malacca, after the region of Malacca, now in modern-day Malaysia:

- HMS Malacca (1809) was a 36-gun Apollo-class fifth rate, that the British East India Company built at Prince of Wales Island as Penang. She was renamed to Malacca before launch in 1810 but sailed to England as Penang. She was commissioned 1810 for the East Indies. She was broken up in 1816.
- HMS Malacca (1853) was a wooden screw sloop launched in 1853 at Moulmain, Burma, and engined in 1854. She was re-engined in 1862 as a screw corvette and was sold in 1869. She was resold to the Japanese Navy and renamed Tsukuba, until being broken up in 1906.
- HMS Malacca was launched in 1927 as a commercial vessel of 210 tons. She served as a requisitioned minesweeper between 1939 and 1942. She was part of the Empire Star evacuation from Singapore. Bombed during the evacuation, she was scuttled in the Tjemako River, Sumatra, on 18 February 1942 after safely delivering her evacuees.

NOTE: All three appear in the National Maritime Museum (United Kingdom), database under the name Malaoca. Penang also appears a second time under that name but with the notation "RENAMED MALACCA".
