= HMS Maori =

There have been two Royal Navy ships called HMS Maori after the indigenous people of New Zealand:

- HMS Maori (1909), a Tribal-class destroyer sunk in 1915.
- HMS Maori (F24), a Tribal-class destroyer launched in 1936 and sunk in 1942.
