= HMS Nereide =

At least four ships of the Royal Navy have borne the name Nereide, after the Nereid (sea nymph):

- HMS Nereide (1797), a 36-gun fifth-rate Sibylle-class frigate, formerly the French frigate Néréide, captured in 1797 by HMS Phoebe off the Scilly Isles. She was recaptured by the French in 1810 during the Battle of Grand Port and broken up after being badly damaged.
- HMS Nereide (1810), a 36-gun fifth-rate Junon-class frigate, formerly the French frigate Vénus, captured in 1810 by HMS Boadicea off St. Paul. She was broken up in 1816.
- HMS Nereide (1910) was an Acorn-class destroyer launched in 1910 and scrapped in 1920.
- HMS Nereide (U64) was a Black Swan-class sloop launched in 1944 and scrapped in 1958.
