= HMS Mandate =

Two vessels of the British Royal Navy have been named HMS Mandate:

- HMS Mandate (1915) was a Admiralty M-class destroyer launched in 1915 and sold in 1921.
- HMS Mandate (J438) was an Algerine-class minesweeper launched in Toronto in August 1944 and arrived at Rosyth for breaking up in December 1957.
