= HMS Namur =

Two ships of the Royal Navy have borne the name HMS Namur, after the capture of the Belgian city of Namur by William III in 1695, whilst another was launched, but never completed:

- HMS Namur (1697) was a 90-gun second rate launched in 1697. She was rebuilt in 1729 and was wrecked in 1749.
- HMS Namur (1756) was a 90-gun second rate launched in 1756. She was rebuilt as a 74-gun third rate in 1805 and was used on harbour service from 1807. She was broken up in 1833.
- HMS Namur was to have been a Battle-class destroyer. She was launched in 1945, but never completed, her hull being scrapped in 1951.
