= HMS Norwich =

Four ships have been named HMS Norwich, after the city of Norwich:

- English ship Norwich (1655), launched in 1655 and wrecked in 1682
- HMS Norwich (1691), launched in 1691 and wrecked in 1692
- HMS Norwich (1693), launched in 1693, rebuilt in 1718, renamed Enterprise in 1744 and broken up in 1771
- HMS Norwich (1745), launched in 1745 and sold in 1768
