= HMS Milne =

Two ships of the Royal Navy have been named HMS Milne, after Vice-Admiral Sir David Milne:

- HMS Milne (1914) was an Admiralty M-class destroyer launched in 1914 and sold in 1921.
- HMS Milne (G14) was a M-class destroyer launched in 1941 and sold to the Turkish Navy in 1959. She was renamed Alp Arslam and was discarded in 1970.
