= HMS Mohawk =

Thirteen vessels of the Royal Navy have borne the name HMS Mohawk, after the Mohawk, an indigenous tribe of North America:

- HMS Mohawk (1756) was a 6-gun sloop launched at Oswego on the Great Lakes in 1756; the French seized her and seven other vessels of the British squadron on Lake Ontario when Fort Oswego surrendered to General Montcalm that same year.
- HMS Mohawk (1759) was a 16-gun snow, constructed in 1759, that participated in the Battle of the Thousand Islands, during the French and Indian War. She was lost in 1764.
- HMS Mohawk was a Massachusetts privateer launched in 1781 that HMS Enterprise captured in 1782 and that the Royal Navy briefly took into service, before selling her in 1783. She then became a slaver and merchant vessel, before becoming a British privateer in 1797. The French captured her in the Mediterranean in 1801 and she served the French Navy until she was sold at Toulon in 1814.
- HMS Mohawk (1795) was a schooner listed in 1795 and operating on the Great Lakes out of Kingston, Ontario. She was condemned in 1803.
- HMS Mowhawk was a sloop listed in 1798. Nothing more is known of her.
- HMS Mohawk was the American navy's 12-gun brig Viper, formerly the USS Ferret, that was captured on 17 January 1813. She was sold in 1814.
- HMS Mohawk was to have been an 18-gun Cruizer-class brig-sloop but she was renamed HMS Ontario before being launched in 1813. She was sold in 1832.
- HMS Mohawk (1843) was a paddle-vessel launched in 1843 and sold in 1852.
- HMS Mohawk (1856) was a Vigilant-class wooden screw gunvessel launched in 1856. She was sold in 1862 to the Emperor of China and renamed Pekin.
- HMS Mohawk (1886) was an Archer-class torpedo cruiser launched in 1886 and sold in 1905.
- HMS Mohawk (1907) was a Tribal-class destroyer launched in 1907 and sold in 1919.
- HMS Mohawk (F31) was a Tribal-class destroyer launched in 1937. She was sunk in April 1941 during the action off Sfax.
- HMS Mohawk (F125) was a Tribal-class frigate launched in 1962 and sold for scrap in 1981.
