= HMS Mauritius =

One ship and one shore establishment of the Royal Navy have borne the name HMS Mauritius, in reference to the former colony of Mauritius:

- HMS Mauritius (80) was a Crown Colony-class light cruiser launched in 1939 and scrapped in 1965.
- HMS Mauritius (shore establishment) was a Royal Navy wireless radio station established at Baie du Tombeau in Mauritius, commissioned in 1962. It ceased to operate in 1975 and its staff was paid off in 1976.
