= HMS Nemesis =

Four ships of the Royal Navy (RN) have borne the name HMS Nemesis, after the goddess Nemesis, of Greek mythology:

- HMS Nemesis (1780) was a 28-gun sixth rate launched in 1780. The French captured her in 1795 at Smyrna, but in 1796 a squadron led by Barfleur brought her out of the neutral port of Tunis; she was sold in 1814.
- HMS Nemesis (1826) was a 46-gun fifth rate launched in 1826 and broken up by 1866.
- HMS Nemesis (1910) was an Acorn-class destroyer launched in 1910. She was lent to the Imperial Japanese Navy in 1917, being renamed Kanran. She was returned in 1919 and was sold in 1921.
- HMS Nemesis (1939) was a Belgian ferry, Princesse Marie-Jose (1923). Renamed by the RN as Southern Isles, Nemesis, Baldur, and Nemesis (second time) before return to Belgium.

== See also ==
- Another Nemesis (1839) was an iron paddle frigate owned by the Honourable East India Company launched in 1839. She was surveyed and laid up in 1843 and put up for sale in 1852.
