= HMS Murray =

Two ships of the Royal Navy have been named HMS Murray, after Vice-Admiral Sir George Murray:

- HMS Murray (1914) was an Admiralty M-class destroyer launched in 1914 and sold in 1921.
- HMS Murray (F91) was a Blackwood-class frigate launched in 1955 and sold in 1970.
