= HMS Malcolm =

HMS Malcolm could refer to any of the following Royal Navy ships:

- HMS Malcolm was the original name for the Admiralty V-class destroyer leader HMS Valkyrie (1917), launched in 1917 and broken up in 1936
- HMS Malcolm (D19) was an Admiralty type flotilla leader, commissioned in 1919 and decommissioned in 1945
- HMS Malcolm (F88) was a Blackwood-class frigate, commissioned in 1957 and decommissioned in 1978
