= HMS Meredith =

Sloop of the Royal Navy

History

Great Britain
- Name: HMS Meredith
- Acquired: March 1763
- Fate: Sold on 1 July 1784

General characteristics
- Displacement: 83 tons
- Length: 54 ft 6 in (16.61 m)
- Beam: 19 ft 6 in (5.94 m)
- Armament: Ten guns

HMS Meredith was a 10-gun sloop of the Royal Navy. She was purchased for Navy service in March 1763 and so far has been the only ship of the Royal Navy to bear the name Meredith.

She spent twenty one years in service, before being sold on 1 July 1784.
