= HMS Orford (1695) =

History

England
- Name: HMS Orford
- Ordered: 22 March 1695
- Builder: Thomas Ellis, Shoreham
- Launched: 29 November 1695
- Commissioned: 26 October 1695
- Fate: Sunk as a breakwater 15 October 1714

General characteristics
- Type: 20-gun Sixth Rate
- Tons burthen: 250 72/94 bm
- Length: 93 ft 8 in (28.5 m) gundeck; 77 ft 6 in (23.6 m) keel for tonnage
- Beam: 24 ft 8 in (7.5 m) for tonnage
- Depth of hold: 10 ft 8 in (3.3 m)
- Armament: initially as ordered; 20 × sakers on wooden trucks (UD); 4 × 3-pdr on wooden trucks (QD); 1703 Establishment; 20 × 6-pdrs on wooden trucks (UD); 4 × 4-pdr on wooden trucks (QD)

HMS Orford was a member of the standardized 20-gun sixth rates built at the end of the 17th century. After commissioning she spent her career escorting convoys of merchant ships, participated with the fleet, including the Battle Velez-Malaga in 1704. She was sold in 1714.

Orford was the first vessel to bear this name in the Royal Navy.

Newport was the second named vessel since its use for a 24-gun sixth rate launched at Portsmouth in 1694 and captured by the French on 5 July 1696 in the Bay of Fundy.

== Construction ==
She was ordered in the third batch of two ships to be built under contract by Thomas Ellis of Shoreham. She was launched on 29 November 1695.

== Commissioned service ==
She was commissioned on 26 October 1695 under the command of Captain Richard Sheerman, RN. Two days later on the 28th, Captain George Delavall, RN took command. In 1696 Captain James Jesson, RN took command for a New England convoy. She was renamed Newport on 3 September 1698.

She was commissioned as HMS Newport in 1699 under the command of Captain Salmon Morricw, RN for the North America and West Indies station through 1701; by 1702 she had been assigned to the fleet. 1703 a new commander took command, Captain Charles Fotherby, RN for service in the North Sea. 1704 she was under command of Captain George Paddon, RN. At the Battle of Velez-Malaga She was in the center squadron of Rooke's Fleet on 13 August 1704. She was with Leake's squadron in 1704–05. In 1705 she was assigned to the Mediterranean under Commander Robert Leake, RN. In 1706, Commander Isaac Cooke, RN took command for service in the English Channel and North Sea. 1709 she was with the Leeward Islands convoy under command of Commander Charles Poole, RN then a Newfoundland convoy in 1710. She was then assigned to the Channel and North Sea in 1711 and just the North Sea 1712 thru 1713. Finally she was assigned as quarantine guard at Hull in 1713.

== Disposition ==
HMS Orford was sold to John Mackfeorys for £408 on 29 July 1714. (Note: A total amount accounting for inflation of approximately £68,900 in today's money.)
