= HMS Meynell =

Two ships of the Royal Navy have borne the name HMS Meynell:

- HMS Meynell (1917) was a Hunt-class minesweeper launched in 1917 and sold in 1922.
- HMS Meynell (L82) was a Hunt-class destroyer launched in 1940, sold to Ecuador in 1954 and renamed in 1955 as Presidente Valesco Ibarra. She was stricken in 1978.
