= HMS Minx =

Four vessels of the Royal Navy have been named HMS Minx:

- HMS Minx (1797) was the merchant ship Tom, purchased as a 12-gun gunboat and initially named Gunboat No. 36, sold in 1801
- HMS Minx (1801) was a 12-gun gun-brig captured by the Dutch in 1809
- HMS Minx (1829) was a 3-gun schooner sold in 1833
- HMS Minx (1846) was a gunboat converted to a tank vessel in 1859 and sold in 1899
