= Southend MPG Mayfly =

1960s British two-seat human-powered aircraft

Mayfly

General information
- Type: Two-seat Human-powered aircraft
- National origin: United Kingdom
- Manufacturer: Southend Man-Powered Group
- Number built: 1

The Southend MPG Mayfly was a British two-seat human-powered aircraft built by members of the Southend Man-Powered Group in the 1960s. It was one of the first two-person human-powered aircraft to have been built and tested, although it never flew.

== Development ==
The Southend Man Powered Group was formed by Brian Kerry, an aerodynamicist then working at Aviation Traders company, in order to help realise a two-person human-powered aircraft he had designed, though several other members of the group later provided design input. The original design dated from 1960, and construction started during the summer of 1961. Originally intended to be completed by May 1962, resource and construction issues meant that the first flight trials did not take place till July 1965. Although some observers claim they saw light under the wheels on some runs, no flights were made.

Issues around poor design and execution impacted the enthusiasm of the members of the Southend MP Group, with that declining as the project wore on. In 1967, a partial collapse of a Nissen hut, in which the aircraft had been stored, damaged the wing sections, effectively ending the project. One contemporary author said of the Mayfly, that it never flew, due to "plain bad luck".

One member of the group, Martyn Pressnell, went on to form the Hertfordshire Pedal Aeronauts, who built the first successful two-person human-powered aircraft, the Toucan.

== Design ==
The aircraft had a tractor monoplane configuration, with the two occupants sitting side-by-side at the very nose of the fuselage. It was a high-wing monoplane. The wing had a constant-chord centre section, with the chord measuring 4 ft 6 in, and tapering outboard sections. Conventional ailerons were fitted, and measured 18 ft in span. The tailplane was all-flying and measured 11 ft by 3 ft. Construction was a mixture of light wood and steel tube. The aircraft was largely covered in aluminised Meculon plastic film.

The Mayfly's crew sat in a reclining position and powered the tractor propeller, mounted on top of a pylon, using a novel steel cable transmission system which avoided the need for gears and bevels.

== Specifications ==
Data from Aeromodeller Annual 1964-65, and Man-Powered Flight

General characteristics

- Crew: 2
- Wingspan: 90 ft (27 m)
- Wing area: 405 sq ft (37.6 m^{2})
- Aspect ratio: 20.3
- Airfoil: NACA 653618
- Empty weight: 156 lb (71 kg)
- Gross weight: 438 lb (199 kg)
- Propellers: 2-bladed, 10 ft (3.0 m) diameter

Performance

- Wing loading: 1.1 lb/sq ft (5.4 kg/m^{2})

== See also ==
Aircraft of comparable role, configuration, and era

- Cook Musfly
- Goodhart Newbury Manflier
- HMPAC Puffin
- HPA Toucan
- Malliga 1
- MacCready Gossamer Albatross
- MacCready Gossamer Condor

Related lists

- List of Human-powered aircraft
