= HMS Nairana =

There have been two Royal Navy ships that have borne the name HMS Nairana;

- HMS Nairana (1917) was a conversion to handle seaplanes.
- HMS Nairana (D05) was an escort carrier that served in World War II, later transferred to the Dutch Navy as HNLMS Karel Doorman
