= HMS Montagu =

Several ships of the Royal Navy have borne the name HMS Montagu:

- HMS Montagu (1660), a 52-gun Speaker-class frigate launched in 1654 as Lyme, renamed in 1660, rebuilt in 1698 and 1716 and broken up in 1749.
- HMS Montagu (1757) was a 60-gun fourth rate ship of the line of the Royal Navy, launched at Sheerness Dockyard on 15 September 1757. In 1774 she was sunk to form part of a breakwater.
- HMS Montagu (1779), an Alfred-class 74-gun third rate launched in 1779 and broken up in 1818.
- HMS Montagu (1901), a Duncan-class battleship launched in 1901 and wrecked in 1906.
