= HMS Ness =

Two vessels of the Royal Navy have been named HMS Ness after the Scottish River Ness:

- HMS Ness (1905) was a River-class destroyer launched on 5 January 1905 at J S White in Cowes and sold in 1919.
- HMS Ness (K219) was a River-class frigate launched at Robbs in Leith on 30 July 1942 and sold in 1956, broken up at Newport.
