= HMS Megaera =

Royal Navy ship name

Three ships of the Royal Navy have borne the name HMS Megaera, after one of the Erinyes of Greek and Roman mythology, Megaera:

- HMS Megaera (1783) was a 14-gun fireship launched in 1783 and sold in 1817.
- HMS Megaera (1837) was a wood paddle sloop launched in 1837 and wrecked in 1843.
- HMS Megaera (1849) was an iron screw frigate launched in 1849, converted to a troopship in 1855 and beached in 1871 as unseaworthy.
