= HMS Martin =

Twelve ships of the Royal Navy have borne the name HMS Martin

- Martin was a ship captured in 1651 and sold in 1653.
- Martin was a ship launched in 1652 and sold in 1667.
- HMS Martin (1694) was a 10-gun ketch launched in 1694 and captured by the French in 1702.
- HMS Martin (1761) was a 14-gun sloop launched in 1761 and sold in 1784.
- HMS Martin (1790) was a 16-gun sloop launched in 1790. She foundered in 1800.
- HMS Martin (1805) was an 18-gun sloop launched in 1805. She foundered in 1806.
- HMS Martin (1809) was an 18-gun sloop launched in 1809 and wrecked in 1817.
- HMS Martin (1821) was an 18-gun sloop launched in 1821. She foundered in 1826.
- HMS Martin (1850) was a 16-gun brig launched in 1850. She was used as a training brig from 1880 and was renamed HMS Kingfisher. She was sold in 1907.

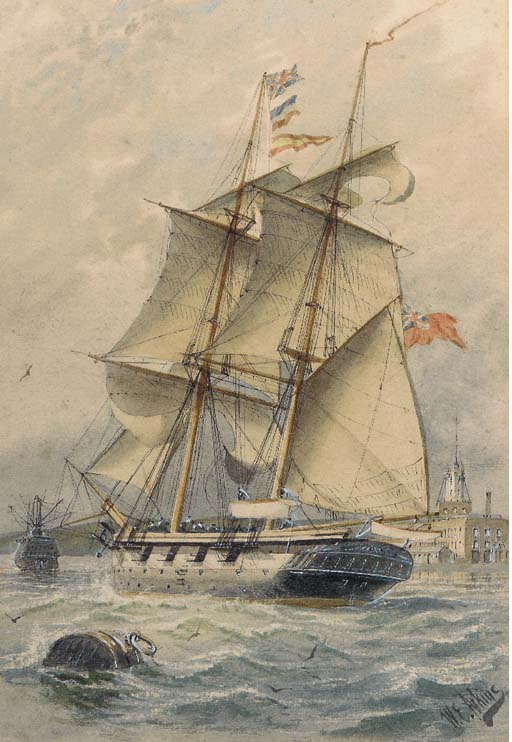
H.M. training brig Martin (1890) entering the harbour at Portsmouth

- HMS Martin (1890) was a training brig, built as HMS Mayflower, but renamed in 1888 before being launched in 1890. She was used as coal hulk from 1907, being renamed C23.
- HMS Martin (1910) was an Acorn-class destroyer launched in 1910 and sold in 1920.
- HMS Martin (G44) was an M-class destroyer launched in 1940 and sunk in 1942.

== See also ==
- HMS Martin Garcia was a ship purchased in 1470 and listed until 1485.
