= HMS Montbretia =

Two ships of the Royal Navy have been named HMS Montbretia :

- HMS Montbretia (1917) an Aubrietia-class sloop launched in 1917 and sold in 1921
- HMS Montbretia (K208), a Flower-class corvette launched in 1941, transferred to Norway as HNoMS Montbretia and sunk in 1942
