= RFA Robert Middleton =

History

United Kingdom
- Name: RFA Robert Middleton
- Launched: 29 June 1938
- Commissioned: 25 August 1938
- Decommissioned: March 1975
- Identification: IMO number: 5297804
- Fate: Sold commercially 1975 and renamed Myrina, scrapped 1983

General characteristics
- Class & type: Dundas-class coastal stores carrier
- Displacement: 1,900 long tons (1,930 t)
- Length: 220 ft (67 m)
- Beam: 35 ft 2 in (10.72 m)
- Draught: 13 ft 6 in (4.11 m)
- Propulsion: 1 × 6-cylinder Atlas Polar diesel engine
- Speed: 12 knots (22 km/h; 14 mph)
- Complement: 17

RFA Robert Middleton (A241) was a Dundas-class coastal stores carrier of the Royal Fleet Auxiliary. Launched in June 1938 and commissioned in August 1938, Robert Middleton was active from 1938 until 1975. Decommissioned in March 1975 Robert Middleton was sold commercially the same year and renamed Myrina.
