= Mullett (1813 ship) =

History

United Kingdom
- Name: Mullett
- Owner: P.Mullett
- Acquired: 1813 by purchase of a prize
- Fate: Condemned in 1814

General characteristics
- Tons burthen: 216 (bm)
- Armament: 12 × 4-pounder guns

Mullett was an American vessel taken in prize. She was condemned in 1814.

== Career ==
Mullett first appeared in the Register of Shipping (RS) in 1813 with T.Smith, master, Mullett, owner, and trade London-Suriname, changing to Plymouth–Suriname. She had undergone repairs for damages in 1813. On 24 April she put into Plymouth, as did London Packet, Annett, master. Mullett was sailing from Plymouth to Suriname and London Packet was sailing from London to Havana when they ran foul of each other. (Note: London Packet, of 235 tons (bm), W.Arnott, master, had been launched at Trieste in 1808.)

On 10 August 1813 Mullett, Smith, master, arrived at Suriname after having gone ashore.

On 19 February 1814 Mullett was at Berbice and unloading, being in a leaky state. She was condemned in March as being unseaworthy.

Towards the end of 1813, the agents of the Berbice Commissioners, had secured space aboard Mullett to take a considerable amount of produce to England. However, after she had sprung a leak, she had to be unloaded, and it took some time to charter an alternative carrier. Consequently, the cargo arrived in Europe at a time when the market was depressed. In addition, the accident itself cost £600. Insurance was not forthcoming as a court ruled that the cargo had been originally loaded on an unseaworthy vessel. Lastly, the Commissioners could not claim against Mullett's owners as they had in the meantime gone bankrupt.
