= HMS Moselle =

Two vessels of the Royal Navy have been named HMS Moselle after the Moselle river:

- HMS Moselle (1793) was a French 24-gun sloop captured by the British at Toulon. She was recaptured by the French in January 1794 and captured again by the British four months later. She was added to the Royal Navy as a sixth rate before being sold in September 1802.
- HMS Moselle (1804) was an 18-gun Cruizer-class brig-sloop commissioned into the Royal Navy in 1804 and sold at Deptford in December 1815.
