= HMS Myngs =

Two ships of the Royal Navy have been named HMS Myngs, after Admiral Sir Christopher Myngs:

- HMS Myngs (1914) was an Admiralty M-class destroyer launched in 1914 and sold in 1921.
- HMS Myngs (R06) was a Z-class destroyer flotilla leader launched in 1943 and sold to the Egyptian Navy in 1955. She was renamed El Qaher in 1956 and was sunk by Israeli aircraft in 1970.
