= HMS Modeste =

Six ships of the Royal Navy have borne the name HMS Modeste:

- HMS Modeste (1759) was a 64-gun third rate, previously the French Modeste. She was captured in 1759, used for harbour service from 1778 and was broken up in 1800.
- HMS Modeste (1793) was a 36-gun fifth rate, previously the French Modeste. She was captured in 1793, used as a floating battery from 1804 and was broken up in August 1814.
- HMS Modeste was a 38-gun fifth rate, previously the French Terpsichore. She was captured in 1814 but never commissioned, and was broken up in 1816.
- HMS Modeste (1837) was an 18-gun sloop launched in 1837 and sold in 1866.
- HMS Modeste (1873) was a wooden screw corvette launched in 1873 and sold in 1888.
- HMS Modeste (U42) was a modified Black Swan-class sloop launched in 1944 and sold in 1961.
