= HMS Marguerite =

Two ships of the Royal Navy have been named HMS Marguerite:

- HMS Marguerite (1915) was an Arabis-class sloop launched in 1915 and transferred to the Royal Australian Navy becoming HMAS Marguerite in 1919
- HMS Marguerite (K54) was a Flower-class corvette launched in 1940 she became the civilian ship Weather Observer in 1947

== Fictional ships ==
- HMS Marguerite, author C.S. Forester has Horatio Hornblower serving on a fictional HMS Marguerite in The Hand of Destiny
