= HMS Minorca =

Several vessels of the British Royal Navy have borne the name HMS Minorca, for the island of Menorca, which the British called "Minorca":

- HMS Minorca (1740) was a lighter launched at Deptford in 1740 that the French captured in 1756.
- HMS Minorca (1779) was a xebec-rigged vessel that the Royal Navy had built at Port Mahon, Minorca in 1779. She participated in one major engagement in 1780. The Navy scuttled her in 1781.
- HMS Minorca was the French brig Alerte (1787), which the Royal Navy captured in 1799 and took into service, renaming her Minorca; the Navy sold her in 1802.
- HMS Minorca (1805) was a Cruizer-class brig-sloop. She served during the Napoleonic Wars in the Mediterranean and was sold in 1814 after an uneventful career.

== See also ==
- Minorca (1799 ship), British merchant ship used to transport convicts to Australia
