= HMS Magnet =

Ten ships of the Royal Navy have borne the name HMS Magnet:

- HMS Magnet (1807) was an 18-gun Cruizer-class brig-sloop launched in 1807 and lost in 1809
- HMS Magnet (1809) was a 16-gun brig-sloop, previously the French privateer St Joseph. She was captured in 1809 and foundered in 1812.
- HMS Magnet (1812) was the American ship Magnet that HMS Ringdove captured in 1812. Magnet became a prison ship at Halifax, Nova Scotia during the War of 1812.The navy renamed Magnet to Attentive, possibly c. 1814, and as Attentive she served as a store ship until broken up in Britain in 1817.
- HMS Magnet (1814) was an 11-gun brig, formerly the merchant ship Governor Simcoe. She was purchased in 1813 and renamed Sir Sydney Smith. She was renamed HMS Magnet in 1814, and was burnt later that year to avoid capture.
- HMS Magnet (1823) was a Cherokee-class brig launched in 1823 that became a Post Office Packet Service packet, sailing out of Falmouth, Cornwall. She was sold in 1847.
- HMS Magnet (1830) was a gunboat listed between 1830 and 1846
- HMS Magnet (1855) was a mortar vessel launched in 1855. She was renamed MV 15 later that year, became a dockyard craft in 1857 and was broken up in 1867
- HMS Magnet (1856) was an Albacore-class wood screw gunboat launched in 1856 and broken up in 1874.
- HMS Magnet (1885) was an iron tug, initially stationed at Devonport, but from 1891 <1891 UK census records> onwards at Portsmouth, where she was a tender to HMS Victory, and classified as a Special Service Vessel.
- HMS Magnet (Z27) was a Net-class boom defence vessel launched in 1938.
