= Mackerel Islets =

Island in Tasmania, Australia

Coordinates: 43°00′S 147°50′E

The Mackerel Islets are two small islands in south-eastern Australia. They are part of the Tasman Island Group, lying close to the south-eastern coast of Tasmania around the Tasman Peninsula.

== Flora and fauna ==
The larger eastern islet contains stands of blackwood, surrounded by introduced grasses and pigface. The western islet is a flat, rocky reef, without vegetation, that is used as a roost site by black-faced cormorants.
