= HMS Nestor (1915) =

Admiralty M-class destroyer

History

United Kingdom
- Name: HMS Nestor
- Builder: Swan, Hunter & Wigham Richardson, Wallsend
- Laid down: 15 May 1915
- Launched: 22 December 1915
- Completed: 29 April 1916
- Fate: Sunk, 31 May 1916

General characteristics
- Class & type: Admiralty M-class destroyer
- Displacement: 994 long tons (1,010 t) standard; 1,042 long tons (1,059 t) full load
- Length: 269 ft (82 m)
- Beam: 27 ft 6 in (8.38 m)
- Draught: 8 ft 8 in (2.64 m) mean; 10 ft 6 in (3.20 m) maximum
- Propulsion: 3 shafts, steam turbines, 25,000 shp (18,642 kW)
- Speed: 34 knots (63 km/h; 39 mph)
- Range: 237–298 tons fuel oil
- Complement: 80
- Armament: 3 × QF 4 in (100 mm) Mark IV guns, mounting P Mk. IX; 3 × single QF 2 pdr "pom-pom" Mk. II; 2 × twin 21 inch (533 mm) torpedo tubes

HMS Nestor, launched on 22 December 1915, was an Admiralty M-class destroyer. She served in the 13th Destroyer Flotilla of the Grand Fleet and was sunk on 31 May 1916 at the Battle of Jutland. The Wreck is designated as a protected place under the Protection of Military Remains Act 1986

== Battle of Jutland ==
Nestor took part in an attack upon the German battlecruiser squadron commanded by Admiral Franz von Hipper, which was engaged by the British battlecruiser squadron under Admiral David Beatty at the start of the battle of Jutland. Twelve destroyers were despatched to approach the line of German battlecruisers and attack with torpedoes. Nestor was lead ship in the attack, followed immediately by HMS Nomad. The attack was met part-way to their target by a German destroyer squadron which exchanged fire as the ships passed. The German battlecruisers turned away, so Nestor also turned back towards the British battlecruisers. However, it now became clear the German battlecruisers had altered course to align with the main German High Seas Fleet, which was now just visible. Accompanied by HMS Nicator and HMS Moorsom, Nestor approached to 3000 yards of the battleships, receiving increasing fire as more German ships brought guns to bear on the destroyers. Nestor was hit and disabled, requiring Nicator to veer off at the last minute from firing its torpedoes so as to avoid a collision. Nicator then broke off and returned to the British squadron. Nestor and Nomad, both disabled after their attack on the battlecruisers, were left to face the approach of the entire German battle fleet. The two ships fired their remaining torpedoes at the approaching enemy, before inevitably being sunk. Nomad was the closer, so was attacked first and sank after a few minutes receiving fire. Her surviving crew were picked up by German ships.

Commander Edward Bingham ordered all charts and confidential books to be destroyed, and the ship's boats and rafts to be provided with water and biscuits and to be launched. He then ordered his crew to lay out cables, as if in anticipation of a tow, simply as an exercise to keep them occupied. German ships opened fire when they reached a range of five miles. The last torpedo was launched, but after only two or three minutes fire, the ship was sinking rapidly and was abandoned. Nestor sank at approximately 5.30 pm.

== Bibliography ==
- Colledge, J. J.; Warlow, Ben (2006) [1969]. Ships of the Royal Navy: The Complete Record of All Fighting Ships of the Royal Navy from the 15th Century to the Present (3rd Rev ed.). London: Chatham Publishing. ISBN 978-1-86176-281-8. OCLC 67375475.
- Friedman, Norman (2009). British Destroyers: From Earliest Days to the Second World War. Barnsley, UK: Seaforth Publishing. ISBN 978-1-84832-049-9.
- Gardiner, Robert & Gray, Randal, eds. (1985). Conway's All The World's Fighting Ships 1906–1921. London: Conway Maritime Press. ISBN 0-85177-245-5.
- March, Edgar J. (1966). British Destroyers: A History of Development, 1892–1953; Drawn by Admiralty Permission From Official Records & Returns, Ships' Covers & Building Plans. London: Seeley Service. OCLC 164893555.
