= HMS Marjoram =

Two vessels of the Royal Navy have been named HMS Marjoram:

- HMS Marjoram (1917), an Anchusa-class sloop launched on 26 December 1917 and wrecked on 17 January 1921.
- HMS Marjoram (K206), a Flower-class corvette ordered on 8 April 1940 and cancelled on 23 January 1941.
