= HMS Musquito (1777) =

HMS Musquito was a gunboat built by the British near a fort in present-day Michigan in 1777. This vessel was later captured at the Battle of Point Coupe by a group of George Rogers Clark's men of the Virginia State Line, then sold by the Virginia assembly to the Continental Navy in late 1779 for use on the Ohio and Mississippi rivers.
