= HMS Marksman =

Two ships of the Royal Navy have been named HMS Marksman. Another was planned but never completed:

- HMS Marksman was to have been an Admiralty M-class destroyer. She was projected in 1913, but not ordered.
- HMS Marksman (1915) was a Marksman-class destroyer launched in 1915 and sold for breaking up in 1921.
- HMS Marksman was to have been an M-class destroyer. She was damaged while under construction in 1941, was salvaged, renamed HMS Mahratta and launched in 1942 and was sunk in 1944.
