= HMS Morne Fortunee =

Three vessels of the British Royal Navy have borne the name Morne Fortunee for Morne Fortuné:

- HMS Morne Fortunee (1803) was possibly originally the Bermudian schooner Glory launched in 1801, but captured as the French privateer Morne Fortunée in 1803. She was wrecked in 1804.
- HMS Morne Fortunee (1806) was the French privateer Regulus that HMS Princess Charlotte captured in 1804. Morne Fortunee was commissioned in 1806 and capsized in 1809.
- HMS Morne Fortunee (1808) was the French privateer Joséphine that HMS Belette captured in 1808 and that was broken up in 1813 at Antigua.
