= HMS Marmion =

At least two ships of the Royal Navy have been named HMS Marmion :

- HMS Marmion (1915) was an Admiralty M-class destroyer launched in 1915 and sunk in 1917.
- HMS Marmion (1944) was an Algerine-class minesweeper of World War II.
