= English ship Marigold (1650) =

Royal Navy ship

History

Commonwealth of England
- Name: Marigold
- Acquired: 1650
- Commissioned: 1652
- Fate: Sold 1658

General characteristics
- Class & type: 22-gun fourth rate
- Sail plan: Full-rigged ship
- Complement: 100 in 1652
- Armament: 30/22 guns

Marigold was a 30-gun fourth rate vessel of the Kingdom of England, She was purchased from Portugal by Royalist agents then captured and commissioned into the Parliamentary Naval Force as Marigold. She conducted fishery protection duties, sailed to the West Indies and finally was with the Fleet off Cadiz. She was sold in 1658.

Marigold was the first named vessel in the English or Royal Navy.

== Specifications ==
She was purchased by the Royalists from Portugal as Crowned Lion. Her name does not appear on the English or Royal Navy named vessel list. She was captured in 1650 and may have been on her delivery voyage. She was purchased and ordered to be fitted for service in the Parliamentary Navy by Admiralty Order 10 January 1651. She was renamed Marigold on 15 November 1651. Her dimensions are unknown, Her crew was 100 personnel, By 1653 she carried 30 guns in wartime and reduced to 22 guns in peacetime.

== Commissioned service ==
=== Service in the Commonwealth Navy ===
She was commissioned into the Commonwealth Navy in 1652 under the command of Captain Humphrey Felstead for fishery protection off Scotland and Ireland. She escorted a convoy of fishing vessels to Iceland in May 1654. In 1655 she sailed with Penn's Fleet to the West Indies in 1655. From 1656 through 1657 she was under the command of Captain George Kendall serving with Robert Blake's Fleet off Cadiz, Spain.

== Disposition ==
Marigold was sold in 1658.
