= HMS Marianne =

Four vessels have served the British Royal Navy under the name Marianne, though it is not clear that all were commissioned.

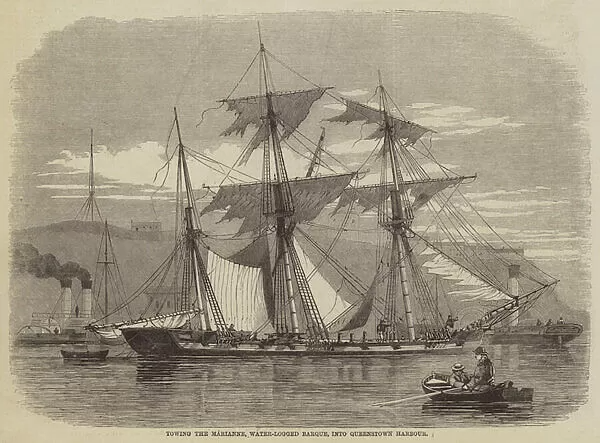
Towing the Marianne, a water-logged barque registered in Falmouth, into Queenstown Harbour, Illustrated Times 1859

- Marianne was a storeship purchased in 1788 and listed until 1793.
- Marianne was the French transport Marianne of 12 guns. The French Navy acquired her in 1798 and the squadron of Commodore Sir Sidney Smith captured her off Syria on 1 March 1799, The French recaptured her in March, but the British recaptured her in November. She was sold in September 1801.
- Marianne was a Spanish 10-gun schooner that HMS Swift captured in 1805 and used as a ship's tender. She was still listed in 1806.
- Marianne was a slave ship of 460 tons (bm), that HMS Styx and Jasper captured on 22 March 1858, and that the Navy purchased in 1859. From 1860 she served at Jamaica as a receiving ship and lazaretto. In February 1864 she was ordered broken up; she was broken up in 1867.
