= HMS Manly =

Eight vessels of the Royal Navy have borne the name HMS Manly (or Manley).

- HMS Manly (1797), also Gunboat No. 37, was the merchant brig Experiment, launched at Leith in 1792, purchased in 1797 for service as a gun-brig, and sold in 1802.
- HMS Manly (1804) was a 16-gun Archer-class gun-brig launched in 1804. During her career she was captured twice, once by the Dutch and once by the Danes. She was recaptured both times, being renamed HMS Bold after her recapture in 1813, as a new Manly had just been commissioned. She was sold in 1814.
- HMS Manly (1812) was a 12-gun Bold-class gun-brig launched in 1812. She served in the War of 1812, her boats participating in the Battle of Lake Borgne. She was sold in 1833.
- HMS Manly (1855) was a mortar vessel launched in 1855, but renamed Mortar Vessel 6 shortly afterwards. She was hulked in 1866.
- HMS Manly (1856) was an Albacore-class screw gunboat launched in 1856 and broken up at Deptford in January 1864.
- HMS Manly (1868) was a paddle-wheel tug launched in 1868 and sold in 1912.
- HMS Manly (1914) was a Yarrow M-class destroyer launched in 1914 and sold in 1921.
- HMS Manly (1981) was a tender launched in 1981 and sold in 1992.
