= HMS Musketeer =

Two ships of the Royal Navy have been named HMS Musketeer:

- HMS Musketeer (1915) was an Admiralty M-class destroyer launched in 1915 and sold in 1921 for breaking up.
- HMS Musketeer (G86) was a M-class destroyer launched in 1941 and scrapped in 1955.
