= HMS New Betsey =

British Royal Navy barge

History

Great Britain
- Name: HMS New Betsey
- Acquired: By purchase under Admiralty order 3 February 1794
- Fate: Sold 1798

General characteristics
- Type: River barge
- Tons burthen: 80 (bm)
- Length: 59 ft 0 in (17.98 m) (overall); 46 ft 7 3/8 in (14.2 m) (keel)
- Beam: 18 ft 0 in (5.49 m)
- Depth of hold: 5 ft 4 1/2 in (1.638 m)
- Complement: 60
- Armament: 2 × 18-pounder guns + 1 × 32-pounder carronades

HMS New Betsey was one of 11 Thames sailing barges that the Admiralty purchased in 1794, for the British Royal Navy. After the outbreak of the French Revolutionary Wars n 1793, the Navy had found itself without vessels capable of inshore work and riverine operations. In 1795, the Admiralty started to order purpose-built schooner or brigantine-rigged gun vessels.

New Betsy was commissioned under the command of Mr. T. Whaley in September 1796. In June 1798, Mr. John Matthew Miller took command.

On 10 July, Miller and Mr. Edward Dawson, master of Grace, dined together on New Betsey, together with their families and other non-commissioned officers, while both barges were at Sheerness. The meal included the imbibing of much wine, and a disagreement developed between Miller and Dawson. Dawson left New Betsey and landed on the beach. When Miller stepped out of a boat to help the ladies disembark, Dawson came up and using his hanger, stabbed Miller, killing him. Dawson's trial took place 25 July at Maidstone, where the jury quickly found him guilty of murder. Dawson was hanged on 27 July on Penenden Heath.

The "Principal Officers and Commissioners of His Majesty's Navy" offered New Betsey, of 80 tons (bm), for sale on 24 October 1798. She sold then.
