= HMS Myosotis =

Two ships of the Royal Navy have been named HMS Myosotis :

- HMS Myosotis (1916) an Arabis-class sloop launched in 1916 and sold in 1923
- HMS Myosotis (K65) a Flower-class corvette launched in 1941 and sold in 1946
