= HMS Newport (1694) =

History

England
- Name: HMS Newport
- Ordered: 21 July 1693
- Builder: Royal Dockyard, Portsmouth
- Launched: 7 April 1694
- Commissioned: 22 January 1694
- Captured: 5 July 1696
- Fate: Captured by the French, renamed Le Nieuport, condemned in 1720

General characteristics
- Type: 20-gun Sixth Rate
- Tons burthen: 253 14/94 bm
- Length: 94 ft 3 in (28.7 m) gundeck; 78 ft 9 in (24.0 m) keel for tonnage
- Beam: 24 ft 7 in (7.5 m) for tonnage
- Depth of hold: 10 ft 11 in (3.3 m)
- Armament: initially as ordered; 20 × sakers on wooden trucks (UD); 4 × 3-pdr on wooden trucks (QD); 1703 Establishment; 20 × 6-pdrs on wooden trucks (UD); 4 × 4-pdr on wooden trucks (QD)

HMS Newport was a member of the standardized 20-gun sixth rates built at the end of the 17th century. She spent her short career sailing between New England and Home Waters. She was captured by French Warships in 1696.

Newport was the first named vessel in the Royal Navy.

== Construction ==
She was ordered in the First Batch of four ships from Portsmouth Dockyard to be built under the guidance of their Master Shipwright, William Stigant. She was launched on 7 April 1694.

== Commissioned service ==
Commissioned on 22 January 1694 under the command of Captain Wentworth Paxton, RN, She sailed round trip New England returning to Home waters in 1694, 1695 and 1696. She did not return in 1696.

== Disposition ==
HMS Newport was captured by French warships in the Bay of Fundy on5 July 1696. She was incorporated into the French Navy as LeNieuport and remained in service until condemned in 1720.
