= HMS Mistletoe =

Multiple ships of the Royal Navy have been named HMS Mistletoe including:

- HMS Mistletoe (1809), a Shamrock-class schooner launched in 1809 and lost in 1816
- HMS Mistletoe (1883) an Albacore-class composite gunboat launched in 1883 and sold in 1907
- HMS Mistletoe (1917) an Anchusa-class sloop launched in 1917 and sold in 1921
