= HMS Nicator =

British M-Class destroyer, WW1

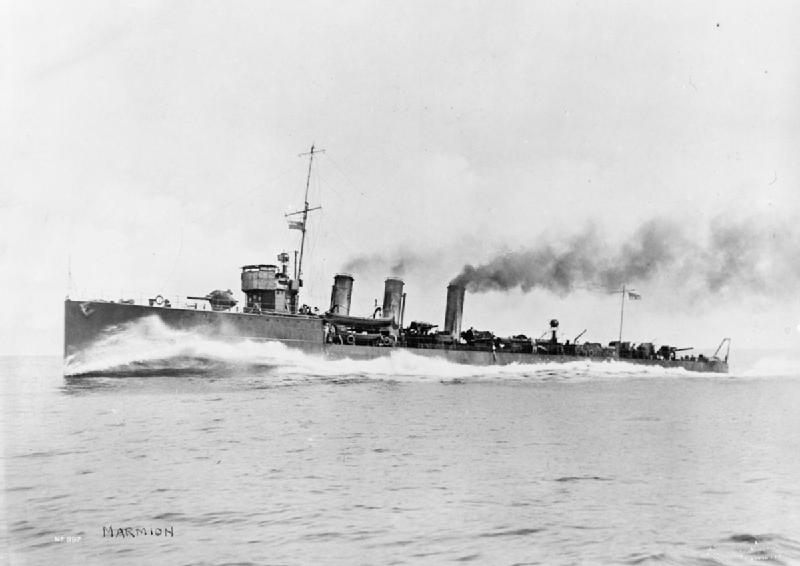
- Sister ship HMS Marmion

History

United Kingdom
- Name: HMS Nicator
- Namesake: Nicator
- Ordered: February 1915
- Builder: William Denny and Brothers, Dumbarton
- Cost: £149,730
- Yard number: 1047
- Laid down: 21 April 1915
- Launched: 3 February 1916
- Completed: 15 April 1916
- Decommissioned: 9 May 1921
- Fate: Sold to be broken up

General characteristics
- Class & type: Admiralty M-class destroyer
- Displacement: 994 long tons (1,010 t) (normal); 1,025 long tons (1,041 t) (full load)
- Length: 265 ft (80.8 m)
- Beam: 26 ft 8 in (8.1 m)
- Draught: 9 ft 3 in (2.8 m)
- Installed power: 3 Yarrow boilers, 25,000 shp (19,000 kW)
- Propulsion: Parsons steam turbines, 3 shafts
- Speed: 34 knots (63.0 km/h; 39.1 mph)
- Range: 2,280 nmi (4,220 km; 2,620 mi) at 17 kn (31 km/h; 20 mph)
- Complement: 80
- Armament: 3 × single QF 4-inch (102 mm) Mark IV guns; 2 × single 2-pdr 40 mm (2 in) AA guns; 2 × twin 21 in (533 mm) torpedo tubes

HMS Nicator was an Admiralty M-class destroyer which served with the Royal Navy during the First World War. The M class was an improvement on the preceding L class, capable of higher speed. Launched in February 1916, the destroyer fought in the Battle of Jutland between May and June 1916, operating in support of the British battlecruisers in their action against the German High Seas Fleet. Nicator claimed, along with sister ship Nestor, the destruction of a German torpedo boat, likely to be V27. The destroyer also attacked the German battlecruisers and battleships and, although no hits were recorded, kept the German ships from closing with the British. This was crucial to limiting losses to the British battlecruiser fleet. The vessel was subsequently fitted with paravanes for anti-submarine warfare. After the war, the destroyer was placed in reserve and subsequently sold to be broken up in May 1921.

== Design and development ==
Nicator was one of sixteen Admiralty M-class destroyers ordered by the British Admiralty in February 1915 as part of the Fourth War Construction Programme during the First World War. The M class was an improved version of the earlier L-class destroyers, required to reach a higher speed in order to counter rumoured German fast destroyers. The remit was to have a maximum speed of 36 knots (67 km/h; 41 mph), and although the eventual design did not achieve this, the greater performance of the M class was appreciated by the Royal Navy. It transpired that the German ships did not exist.

The destroyer was 265 feet (80.77 m) long between perpendiculars, with a beam of 26 feet 9 inches (8.15 m) and a draught of 9 feet 3 inches (2.82 m). Displacement was 994 long tons (1,010 t) normal and 1,025 long tons (1,041 t) full load. Power was provided by three Yarrow boilers feeding Parsons steam turbines rated at 25,000 shaft horsepower (19,000 kW) and driving three shafts, to give a design speed of 34 knots (63 km/h; 39 mph). Three funnels were fitted. A fuel load of 268 long tons (272 t) of oil was carried, including 40 long tons (41 t) in peace tanks that were not used in wartime, giving a design range of 2,280 nautical miles (4,220 km; 2,620 mi) at 17 knots (31 km/h; 20 mph).

Armament consisted of three single QF 4-inch (100 mm) Mk IV guns on the ship's centreline, with one on the forecastle, one aft on a raised platform and one between the middle and aft funnels. Two single QF 2-pounder 40 mm (2 in) "pom-pom" anti-aircraft guns were carried, while torpedo armament consisted of two twin rotating mounts for 21 in (533 mm) torpedoes. Nicator was equipped with two depth charge chutes aft, the number of depth charges carried increasing during the duration of the war. The ship had a complement of 80 officers and ratings.

== Construction and career ==
Nicator was laid down by William Denny and Brothers of Dumbarton on 21 April 1915 with the yard number 1047. Construction cost £149,730. Launched on 3 February 1916 and completed on 15 April, the ship was the first in the Royal Navy to be named after Seleucus I Nicator, one of the Diadochi of Alexander the Great and the founder of the Seleucid dynasty. The vessel was deployed as part of the Grand Fleet, joining the Thirteenth Destroyer Flotilla. Soon after entering service, the destroyer formed part of the escort to troops sent to Dublin on 25 April to put down the Easter Rising.

Between 31 May and 1 June 1916, Nicator sailed as part of the flotilla, led by the flotilla cruiser Champion, to confront the German High Seas Fleet in the Battle of Jutland. The flotilla was part of the destroyer screen for the British battlecruisers as they confronted their German equivalents. As the two fleets converged, Nicator and sister ship Nestor attacked the German torpedo boats and claimed to sink one. V27, which was stricken by gunfire, is likely to be their victim.

Following the destruction of Queen Mary, the flotilla, reinforced by members of the Ninth Destroyer Flotilla and Moorsom and Morris of the Tenth, sped to attack the German fleet. The destroyers engaged with the German destroyer screen and a fierce battle ensued. Nicator was one of only two from the flotilla, along with Nestor, that managed to break through to reach the German line. They first encountered the battlecruiser Lützow, which turned away to avoid their attack. The destroyer then launched a torpedo at the German battlecruiser Derfflinger, which missed. Another torpedo got stuck in its tube and failed to fire. Although the attack did not record any hits, it did force the German warships to manoeuvre away and so enabled the British battlecruiser fleet, which had already lost two of their number, to escape without further harm.

As Nestor and Nicator turned away from the German battlecruisers, the battleships of the High Seas Fleet appeared on the horizon. Nicator fired one more shell at the retreating German ships and retired. The destroyers then joined with a larger flotilla of twelve destroyers which was stationed to the east of the Grand Fleet. As the battlefleets manoeuvred around each other, Nicator attempted to attack the German battleships with gunfire but without success. As the battle drew to a close, the destroyer avoided a torpedo launched by the submarine U-52, which also escaped, before retiring to Rosyth low on fuel.

During early 1917, Nicator was equipped with anti-submarine paravanes and on 16 and 17 April, the ship was one of six used for patrols of Dogger Bank known as high speed sweeps, although no submarines were found during the operation. The Admiralty identified that the patrols were not as successful at detecting and destroying submarines as they needed and focused instead on the more effective convoy model. The vessel was transferred to Buncrana with the Second Destroyer Flotilla and served there for the last year of the war. The Buncrana-based destroyers were employed on convoy escort, rendezvousing with trans-Atlantic convoys inbound from the Hampton Roads, and Sydney, Nova Scotia and escorting them to ports on the Clyde and Mersey and escorting outbound Atlantic convoys until they dispersed.

After the armistice, Nicator was transferred to Portsmouth. This was a temporary post and during the following year, the destroyer was moved to the local defence flotilla at Portland. As the Royal Navy returned to a peacetime level of strength, both the number of ships and personnel needed to be reduced to save money. In addition, the harsh conditions of wartime service, particularly the combination of high speed and the poor weather that is typical of the North Sea, exacerbated by the fact that the hull was not galvanised, meant that the destroyer was in need of repair to remain in service. On 9 May 1921, the destroyer was decommissioned and sold to Thos. W. Ward of Milford Haven to be broken up.

== Pennant numbers ==
Pennant number	Date
G55	September 1915
F05	January 1917
HA4	January 1918
G01	January 1919
