= HMS Nerissa =

Three vessels of the British Royal Navy have been named HMS Nerissa:

- HMS Nerissa (1916) was a Yarrow M-class destroyer launched at Yarrow in February 1916 and sold in November 1921 at Newport.
- HMS Nerissa was an N-class destroyer launched on 7 May 1940 at John Brown, Clydebank and lent to the Polish Navy in October 1940 and renamed ORP Piorun. Returned to the Royal Navy in September 1946 the vessel was recommissioned as HMS Noble, and broken up nine years later in 1955.
- HMS Nerissa (J456) was an Algerine-class minesweeper launched at Redfern on 25 November 1944 and arrived at Llanelly for breaking up in August 1960.
