= HMS Manilla =

Six vessels of the Royal Navy have been named HMS Manilla after Manilla:

- HMS Manilla (1763) was a merchant ship captured in 1762 and commissioned in 1763 as a 14-gun sloop. She was sold at Madras in 1763.
- HMS Manilla (1780) was a 14-gun storeship purchased in 1780 and lost in the East Indies in 1782.
- HMS Manilla (1809) was a 36-gun Apollo-class frigate launched in 1809 and wrecked off the Texel in 1812.
- HMS Manilla (1819) was to be a 46-gun Seringapatam-class frigate ordered in 1819 but cancelled in 1831.
- HMS Manilla (1860) was the civilian storeship Atalante purchased in 1860 and named Manilla in 1861. She was exchanged for the barque Ingeberg (see below) in 1870.
- HMS Manilla (1870) was the civilian storeship Ingeberg taken over in 1870. She was sold at Yokohama in 1872.
