= HMS Narwhal =

Three ships of the Royal Navy have borne the name HMS Narwhal, after the marine mammal, the narwhal:

- HMS Narwhal (1915) was an Admiralty M-class destroyer launched in 1915. She was involved in a collision in 1919 that broke her back, and was broken up in 1920.
- HMS Narwhal (N45) was a Grampus-class submarine launched in 1935 and lost to an unknown cause in 1940. found in 2017
- HMS Narwhal (S03) was a Porpoise-class submarine launched in 1957 and sunk as a target in 1983.
