= HMS Manners =

HMS Manners has been the name of more than one ship of the British Royal Navy, and may refer to:

- HMS Manners (1915), an Admiralty M-class destroyer launched in 1915 and sold in 1921
- HMS Manners (K568), a Captain-class frigate in commission from 1943 to 1945
