= HMS M3 =

HMS M3 may refer to the following ships of the Royal Navy:

- HMS Raglan (1915), a monitor initially named M3
- HMS M3 (1918), the third M-class submarine

== See also ==
- HSwMS M3 (1940) (Swedish: HMS M3), a Swedish Royal Navy M-type minesweeper; see List of mine warfare vessels of the Swedish Navy
- HSwMS Visborg (M03) (1970) (Swedish: HMS M3), a Swedish Royal Navy minelayer
