= HMS Mystic =

Two ships of the Royal Navy have borne the name HMS Mystic

- HMS Mystic (1915) was an Admiralty M-class destroyer, originally ordered as HMS Myrtle, but renamed before being launched in 1915. She was sold in 1921.
- HMS Mystic (J455) was an Algerine-class minesweeper launched in 1944 and scrapped in 1958.
