= HMS Maeander =

Two ships of the Royal Navy have borne the name HMS Maeander, after the Maeander river, or its patron Meander, in Greek mythology:

- HMS Maeander (1813) was a 38-gun fifth rate launched in 1813 and broken up in 1817.
- HMS Maeander (1840) was a 44-gun fifth rate launched in 1840 and used as a coal hulk from 1859. She was ordered to be broken up in 1865 but survived to be wrecked in 1870.
