= HMS Mimosa =

Two ships of the Royal Navy have been named HMS Mimosa:

- HMS Mimosa (1915) was an Acacia-class sloop launched in 1915 and sold in 1922
- HMS Mimosa (K11) was a Flower-class corvette, launched in 1941, transferred to FNFL and sunk in 1942
