= HMS Noble =

HMS Noble is the name of the following ships in the Royal Navy:

- HMS Noble (1915)
- HMS Noble (G65)
- HMS Noble (G84)
