= HMS Moth =

Two ships of the Royal Navy have borne the name HMS Moth after the insect, the Moth:

- HMS Moth (1907) was a coastal destroyer launched in 1907. She had been renamed TB 12 in 1906. She was sunk by a mine in 1915.
- HMS Moth (1915) was an Insect-class gunboat launched in 1915. She was scuttled in 1941 but was salvaged by the Japanese and recommissioned with the Imperial Japanese Navy as Suma. She was sunk by a mine in 1945.
