= USS Mackerel =

USS Mackerel may refer to:

- USS Mackerel (SS-204), was a Mackerel-class submarine launched 28 September 1940 and served as a training submarine during World War II
- USS Mackerel (SST-1), was a T-1-class submarine launched 17 July 1953, and served as a training and testing submarine until 1978
- USS Mackerel, a fictional U.S. Navy World War II submarine featured in the 2005 novel Pride Runs Deep by R. Cameron Cooke
