= HMS Nabob =

Two ships of the Royal Navy have borne the name HMS Nabob, an earlier spelling for Nawab, a deputy provincial governor in the Mughal Empire. not the current usage which refers to an Anglo-Indian term for a conspicuously wealthy man who made his fortune in the Orient, especially in the Indian subcontinent.

- HMS Nabob was the East Indiaman Triton, launched in 1766, which the Navy bought in 1777 for use as a storeship, converted to a hospital ship in 1780, and then sold in 1783.
- HMS Nabob (D77) was the ex-USS Edisto, an escort carrier launched in 1943 and provided to the United Kingdom on Lend-Lease. She was torpedoed in 1944, not repaired, and sold to the Netherlands for breaking up in 1947, resold in 1951, and finally broken up in Taiwan in 1977.
