= HMS Nasturtium =

Two ships of the Royal Navy have been named HMS Nasturtium:

- HMS Nasturtium (1915) was an Arabis-class sloop launched in 1915 and sunk in 1916
- HMS Nasturtium (K107) was a Flower-class corvette ordered as La Paimpolaise by the French Navy she was taken over in 1940 and renamed. She was sold to Greece in 1948 and renamed Cania
