= HMS Niemen =

Two ships of the Royal Navy have borne the name HMS Niemen:

- HMS Niemen (1809) was a 38-gun fifth rate captured from the French in 1809 and broken up in 1815.
- HMS Niemen (1820) was a 28-gun sixth rate launched in 1820 and broken up by 1828.
