= HMS Mutine =

Ten ships of the Royal Navy have borne the name HMS Mutine (the feminine form of the French name "Mutin", meaning "mutinous" or "joker"):

- HMS Mutine was a 14-gun cutter, previously the French ship Mutin. Jupiter and Pilot captured her on 2 October 1779. She was commissioned into the Royal Navy as HMS Mutine. She was renamed HMS Pigmy in 1798 and was wrecked in 1805.
- HMS Mutine (1795) was a 12-gun brig in service in 1795.
- HMS Mutine (1797) was an 18-gun brig-sloop captured from the French in 1797. She was sold in 1803.
- HMS Mutine (1806) was an 18-gun Cruizer-class brig-sloop launched in 1806 and sold in 1819.
- HMS Mutine (1825) was a 6-gun Cherokee-class brig-sloop launched in 1825 that became a Post Office Packet Service packet, sailing out of Falmouth, Cornwall, in 1826. She was sold into civilian service in 1841 as a whaler, being renamed Aladdin. The Tasmanian Government purchased her in 1885 to use as a powder hulk. She was broken up at Hobart in 1902.
- HMS Mutine (1844) was a 12-gun brig launched in 1844 and wrecked in 1848.
- HMS Mutine (1859) was a Greyhound-class sloop launched in 1859 and sold in 1870.
- HMS Mutine (1880) was a Doterel-class sloop launched in 1880 and used as a boom defence vessel in 1899. She was renamed HMS Azov in 1904 and was sold in 1921.
- HMS Mutine (1900) was a Condor-class sloop launched in 1900. She was used as a survey vessel from 1907 and as a Royal Naval Reserve drill ship from 1925. She was sold in 1932.
- HMS Mutine (J227) was an Algerine-class minesweeper launched in 1942 and sold in 1966.
