= HMS M1 =

HMS M1 may refer to the following ships of the Royal Navy:

- HMS Abercrombie (1915), a monitor initially named M1
- HMS M1 (1917), the first M-class submarine

== See also ==
- HSwMS M1 (1937) (Swedish: HMS M1), a Swedish Royal Navy M-type minesweeper; see List of mine warfare vessels of the Swedish Navy
- HSwMS Älvsnabben (M01) (1943) (Swedish: HMS M1), a Swedish Royal Navy minelayer
