= HMS Mersey =

Five ships and a shore establishment of the Royal Navy have been named HMS Mersey after the River Mersey:

Ships

- HMS Mersey (1814) was a Conway-class 26-gun sixth rate launched in 1814, used for harbour service from 1832, and broken up in 1852.
- HMS Mersey (1858) was a wooden screw frigate launched in 1858 and sold in 1875.
- HMS Mersey (1885) was a Mersey-class protected cruiser launched in 1885 and sold in 1905.
- HMS Mersey (1914) was a Humber-class monitor launched in 1913 for Brazil, but purchased by the Royal Navy in 1914 and sold in 1921.
- HMS Mersey (P283) is a River-class offshore patrol vessel launched in 2003 and currently in service.

Shore establishments

- HMS Mersey (shore establishment) was the Navy's Liverpool depot, established as a branch of HMS Eaglet and commissioned in 1940, and paid off in 1946.

Tenders

- HMS Mersey was the name borne by a number of tenders to the Mersey Division Royal Naval Reserve
  - HM Motor minesweeper 1075 was HMS Mersey between 1949 and 1956.

Two Ton-class minesweepers bearing the name HMS Mersey served as tenders to the Mersey Division RNR.

  - HMS Amerton M1105 was HMS Mersey between 1954 and 1959.
  - HMS Pollington M1173 was HMS Mersey between 1959 and 1975.

== Battle honours ==
- Belgian Coast, 1914–15
- Königsberg, 1915
