= HMS Matchless =

Two ships of the Royal Navy have been named HMS Matchless:

- HMS Matchless (1914) was an Admiralty M-class destroyer launched in 1914 and sold in 1921.
- HMS Matchless (G52) was an M-class destroyer launched in 1941, sold to the Turkish Navy in 1959 and renamed Kılıç Ali Paşa, and decommissioned in 1970.
