= HMS Magnanime =

Two ships of the Royal Navy have been named HMS Magnanime:

- HMS Magnanime (1748) was a 74-gun third rate captured from the French in 1748 and broken up in 1775.
- HMS Magnanime (1780) was a 64-gun third rate launched in 1780. She was razeed in 1794 to a 44-gun fifth rate frigate and was broken up in 1813.
