= HMS Mediator =

Three ships of the Royal Navy have borne the name HMS Mediator:

- HMS Mediator (1745) was a 10-gun sloop purchased in 1745 and captured that year by a French privateer.
- HMS Mediator (1782) was a 44-gun fifth rate launched 1782. She became the storeship HMS Camel in 1788, and was broken up in 1810.
- HMS Mediator was a 44-gun fifth rate, previously the merchant Ann & Amelia. She was purchased in 1804, converted to a fireship in 1809, and expended that year in the Battle of the Basque Roads.
