= Mona's Isle =

Mona's Isle may refer to:

== Places ==
- Isle of Man, a self-governing British Crown Dependency, located in the Irish Sea between the islands of Great Britain and Ireland
- Isla de Mona, an island off Puerto Rico in the Caribbean
- Ynys Môn, ("Mona's Isle") the Welsh name for Anglesey

== Ships ==
- SS Mona's Isle (1830), a wooden paddle steamer operated by the Isle of Man Steam Packet Company
- SS Mona's Isle (1860), an iron paddle steamer operated by the Isle of Man Steam Packet Company, sank in a storm in Liverpool Bay in 1909
- SS Mona's Isle (1882), a paddle steamer operated by the Isle of Man Steam Packet Company until she was purchased by The Admiralty in 1915
- SS Mona's Isle (1905), a packet steamer operated by the South Eastern & Chatham Railway Company and the Isle of Man Steam Packet Company
- SS Mona's Isle (1950), a passenger vessel operated by the Isle of Man Steam Packet Company
- MV Mona's Isle (1966), a roll on - roll off car and passenger ferry operated by the Isle of Man Steam Packet Company
