= HMS Meadowsweet =

Flower-class corvette of the Royal Navy

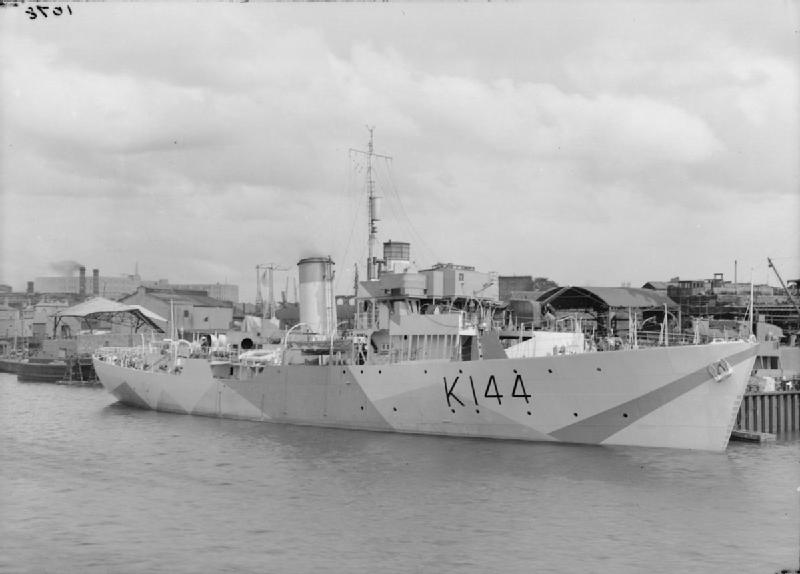
- HMS Meadowsweet

History

United Kingdom
- Name: HMS Meadowsweet
- Ordered: 25 July 1939
- Builder: Charles Hill & Sons, Bristol, England
- Laid down: 12 August 1941
- Launched: 28 March 1942
- Commissioned: 8 July 1942
- Out of service: 31 March 1951 - sold
- Identification: Pennant number: K144
- Fate: Sold 1951

General characteristics
- Class & type: Flower-class corvette (original)
- Displacement: 925 long tons (940 t; 1,036 short tons)
- Length: 205 ft (62.48 m)o/a
- Beam: 33 ft (10.06 m)
- Draught: 11.5 ft (3.51 m)
- Propulsion: single shaft; 2 × fire tube Scotch boilers; 1 × 4-cycle triple-expansion reciprocating steam engine; 2,750 ihp (2,050 kW)
- Speed: 16 knots (29.6 km/h)
- Range: 3,500 nautical miles (6,482 km) at 12 knots (22.2 km/h)
- Complement: 85
- Sensors & processing systems: 1 × SW1C or 2C radar; 1 × Type 123A or Type 127DV sonar
- Armament: 1 × BL 4-inch (101.6 mm) Mk.IX single gun; 2 x double Lewis machine gun; 2 × twin Vickers machine gun; 2 × Mk.II depth charge throwers; 2 × Depth charge rails with 40 depth charges; initially with minesweeper equipment, later removed

HMS Meadowsweet (K144) was a Flower-class corvette that served with the Royal Navy during the Second World War. She served as an ocean escort in the Battle of the Atlantic.
