= HMS Mackerel =

Three ships of the Royal Navy have borne the name Mackerel, after the Mackerel, a name given to a number of species of fish:

- English ship Mackerel (1646) was a dogger captured in 1646 and last recorded in 1647.
- HMS Mackerel (1804) was a 4-gun Ballahoo-class schooner launched in 1804 and sold in 1815.
- HMS Mackerel (1856) was an Albacore-class wooden screw gunboat launched in 1856 and broken up in 1862.
