= HMS Mayfly =

HMS Mayfly may refer to two vessels of the British Royal Navy named after the mayfly:

- Mayfly, a torpedo boat launched in January 1907, having been named HMS TB 11 whilst under construction; sunk by a naval mine in March 1916
- HMS Mayfly (1915), a Fly-class river gunboat constructed in sections at Yarrow in 1915; lent to the War Department in January 1918; sold at Basra in March 1923

== See also ==
- HMA No. 1 - first RN airship also known as "Mayfly"
