= HMS Northampton =

Two ships of the Royal Navy have been called HMS Northampton, after the English town of Northampton:

- HMS Northampton (1876) was a Nelson-class armoured cruiser, launched in 1876, hulked as a boys' training ship in 1894 and sold for breaking up in 1905.
- HMS Northampton was previously HMS Sharpshooter, a torpedo gunboat launched in 1888 and renamed HMS Northampton in 1912 when she was used for harbour service. She was broken up in 1922.
