= HMS Moorsom (1914) =

British M-Class destroyer, WW1

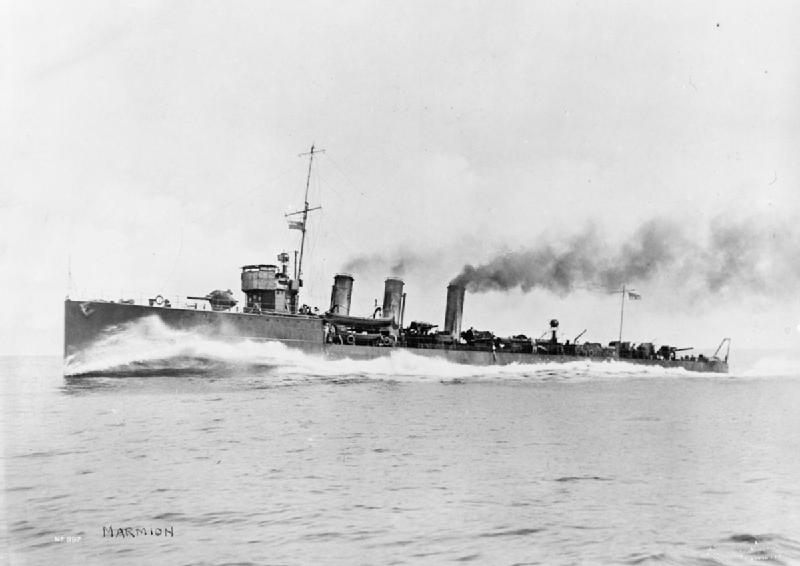
- Sister ship HMS Marmion

History

United Kingdom
- Name: HMS Moorsom
- Namesake: Admiral Sir Robert Moorsom
- Ordered: May 1913
- Builder: John Brown & Company, Clydebank
- Yard number: 427
- Laid down: 27 February 1914
- Launched: 20 December 1914
- Completed: 17 March 1915
- Out of service: 8 November 1921
- Fate: Sold to be broken up

General characteristics
- Class & type: Admiralty M-class destroyer
- Displacement: 860 long tons (870 t) (normal); 1,021 long tons (1,037 t) )full load)
- Length: 273 ft 8 in (83.4 m) (o/a)
- Beam: 26 ft 9 in (8.2 m)
- Draught: 16 ft 3 in (5.0 m)
- Installed power: 3 Yarrow boilers, 25,000 shp (19,000 kW)
- Propulsion: Brown-Curtis steam turbines, 3 shafts
- Speed: 34 knots (63.0 km/h; 39.1 mph)
- Range: 3,450 nmi (6,390 km; 3,970 mi) at 15 kn (28 km/h; 17 mph)
- Complement: 76
- Armament: 3 × single QF 4-inch (102 mm) Mark IV guns; 1 × single 2-pdr 40 mm (2 in) AA gun; 2 × twin 21 in (533 mm) torpedo tubes

HMS Moorsom was an Admiralty M-class destroyer which served in the Royal Navy during the First World War. The M class was an improvement on the preceding L class, capable of higher speed. Moorsom, the first ship to enter navy service to be named after Admiral Sir Robert Moorsom, was launched in December 1914, initially serving as part of the Grand Fleet before being transferred to the Harwich Force the following year. Briefly rejoining the Grand Fleet, the destroyer saw service in the Battle of Jutland in 1916 supporting the British battlecruisers and received hits from a battleship of the German High Seas Fleet. Moorsom also undertook other duties, including escorting the troop ship Mauretania in June 1915 and the minelayer Princess Margaret in August 1915 and November 1916. Placed within the Dover Patrol, the destroyer formed part of the cover for monitors including Erebus and Terror on attacks on Ostend and Zeebrugge in May and June 1917, and April and May 1918. After the Armistice, the destroyer was placed in reserve and subsequently sold to be broken up in November 1921.

== Design and development ==
Moorsom was one of the initial six Admiralty M-class destroyers ordered by the British Admiralty in May 1913 as part of the 1913–14 Naval Programme, one of the last destroyers to be ordered before the outbreak of the First World War. The M-class was an improved version of the earlier L class destroyers, designed to reach a higher speed in order to counter rumoured German fast destroyers, although it transpired these vessels did not exist. Although envisioned to have a maximum speed of 36 knots (67 km/h; 41 mph), they were eventually designed for a speed 2 knots (3.7 km/h; 2.3 mph) slower.

The destroyer was 273 feet 8 inches (83.4 m) long overall, with a beam of 26 feet 9 inches (8.2 m) and a draught of 16 feet 3 inches (5.0 m). Displacement was 860 long tons (870 t) normal and 1,021 long tons (1,037 t) full load. Power was provided by three Yarrow boilers feeding Brown-Curtis steam turbines rated at 25,000 shaft horsepower (19,000 kW) that drove three shafts to give a design speed of 34 knots (63 km/h; 39 mph). Three funnels were fitted and 296 long tons (301 t) of oil was carried, giving a design range of 3,450 nautical miles (6,390 km; 3,970 mi) at 15 knots (28 km/h; 17 mph).

Armament consisted of three single QF 4-inch (102 mm) Mk IV guns on the ship's centreline, with one on the forecastle, one aft on a raised platform and one between the middle and aft funnels. A single 2-pounder 40 mm (2 in) "pom-pom" anti-aircraft gun was carried, while torpedo armament consisted of two twin mounts for 21 in (533 mm) torpedoes. The ship had a complement of 76 officers and ratings.

== Construction and career ==
Moorsom was laid down by John Brown & Company of Clydebank on 27 February 1914 with the yard number 427, was launched on 20 December, started trials on 1 February in the Firth of Clyde the following year and was completed on 17 March. The vessel was the first to be named after the naval officer Admiral Sir Robert Moorsom. Moorsom was deployed as part of the Grand Fleet, joining the newly formed Tenth Destroyer Flotilla.

The destroyer took part in a wide range of activities during the war, usually alongside other members of the flotilla. For example, the flotilla was involved in escorting ships in 1915. Moorsom was chosen to accompany Mauretania on 9 and 10 June as the troop ship sailed to join the Gallipoli campaign. On 16 August, the ship formed part of a flotilla of eight destroyers that escorted the minelayer Princess Margaret on a sortie from Sheerness. One of their number, Mentor, was torpedoed by the torpedo boats of the German Second Flotilla, but the crew of Moorsom thought the explosion meant that they had entered a minefield and, taking refuge behind the minelayer, escaped without harm. By October, the destroyer, along with the rest of the flotilla, had been transferred to the Harwich Force.

At the Battle of Jutland on 31 May 1916, Moorsom was attached to the Thirteenth Destroyer Flotilla under the light cruiser Champion. The destroyer was transferred from the Harwich Force, along with Morris, to supplement the Grand Fleet, which had insufficient destroyers to shield both the 1st and 2nd Battlecruiser Squadrons. The flotilla attacked the battlecruisers of the German High Seas Fleet after the destruction of the Indefatigable and Queen Mary. The vessel became separated from the flotilla and instead joined in a melee with German torpedo boats led by V27. Disengaging, the destroyer sighted the departing vessels of the High Seas Fleet and launched four torpedoes, none of which hit. Moorsom did not return to the battle and instead was forced to return to port with damaged oil tanks. It is likely the tanks were hit by 5.9 in (150 mm) shells from the battleship Grosser Kurfürst. On 18 August, the destroyer was briefly, with Milne and Murray, again seconded to the Grand Fleet, serving with the 3rd Battle Squadron. By the following day, the ship had returned to the Tenth Flotilla, now based in Dover. On 28 November, Moorsom once again escorted Princess Margaret on a mission, this time to lay 500 mines 20 nautical miles (37 km; 23 mi) west of Borkum.

Moorsom was one of eight destroyers of the Tenth Flotilla sent with the destroyer leader Nimrod to Dunkirk on 19 January 1917 to provide reinforcement to the Dover Patrol in the event of German torpedo attacks on the Dover Barrage and shipping in the English Channel. On 22 January, an intercepted German radio signal warned the British Admiralty that the German Sixth Torpedo Boat Flotilla was to be sent from the High Seas Fleet to reinforce their forces at Flanders. By 27 January, the destroyer was part of a flotilla, which also included Manly, Mansfield, Matchless, Morris, Nimrod and Phoebe, that was to patrol east of the Schouwen Bank. The force did not see the German ships, but Moorsom was nearly accidentally rammed by Starfish, which was part of another destroyer division operating in the area, due to the lack of visibility. The warship was then given a refit, returning to Dover on 28 February. Moorsom rejoined the Dover Patrol, which now included thirteen monitors, forming part of the Sixth Destroyer Flotilla. On 11 May, the destroyer was part of the escort for the monitors Erebus, Marshal Soult, Sir John Moore and Terror in their bombardment of Ostend. The operation was deemed a success as the Admiralty gained intelligence that the bombardment led to the German command doubting that Ostend was a safe haven for their warships. Moorsom formed part of the support for a similar bombardment on 5 June by Erebus and Terror.

The destroyer accompanied a subsequent attack on Zeebrugge by monitors on 23 April 1918, which also included the sinking of blockships to impede the flow of German submarines leaving the port. The ship provided a similar service to the monitors that attacked Ostend on 9 May, which again included Erebus, Sir John Moore and Terror. Although this operation did not meet the expectations of the Admiralty and the port remained open, the bombardment was achieved without interference by enemy warships or the loss of any British vessel.

After the Armistice of 11 November 1918 that ended the war, the Royal Navy returned to a peacetime level of strength and both the number of ships and personnel needed to be reduced to save money. Moorsom was declared superfluous to operational requirements. On 15 October 1919, the destroyer was given a reduced complement and placed in reserve at Devonport. However, this did not last long and, on 8 November 1921, Moorsom was sold to Slough TC to be broken up in Germany.

== Pennant numbers ==
Pennant number	Date
HA2	August 1915
H84	January 1918
D27	September 1918
H46	January 1919
