= HMS Nessus =

Two vessels of the British Royal Navy have been named HMS Nessus after Nessus, a centaur of Greek mythology:

- HMS Nessus (1915) was an Admiralty M-class destroyer launched by Swan Hunter on 24 August 1915 and sunk on 8 September 1918 in a collision with the cruiser HMS Amphitrite in the North Sea.
- HMS Nessus was a 150-ton river steamer armed with a single 3-pounder gun. The vessel was bought in 1926 in Hong Kong and sold in 1929.
