= HMS Lochinvar (1915) =

British L-Class destroyer

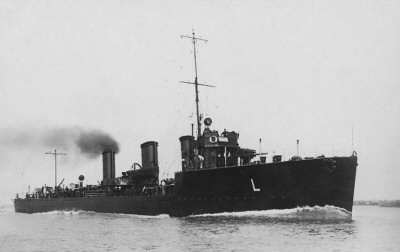
- Sister ship Laertes

History

United Kingdom
- Name: HMS Lochinvar
- Builder: Beardmore, Dalmuir, Clydebank
- Yard number: 527
- Laid down: 9 January 1915
- Launched: 9 October 1915
- Completed: 1 December 1915
- Decommissioned: 25 November 1921
- Fate: Broken up

General characteristics (as built)
- Class & type: Laforey-class destroyer
- Displacement: 965 long tons (980 t) (normal); 1,150 long tons (1,170 t) (deep load)
- Length: 268 ft 8 in (81.9 m) (o/a)
- Beam: 27 ft 8 in (8.43 m)
- Draught: 10 ft 6 in (3.20 m)
- Installed power: 4 Yarrow boilers, 24,500 shp (18,300 kW)
- Propulsion: Parsons steam turbines, 2 shafts
- Speed: 29 knots (33.4 mph; 53.7 km/h)
- Range: 1,720 nmi (3,190 km) at 15 kn (28 km/h)
- Complement: 73
- Armament: 3 × single QF 4-inch (102 mm) Mark IV guns; 1 × single 7.7 mm (0.3 in) Maxim gun; 2 × twin 21 in (533 mm) torpedo tubes

HMS Lochinvar was a repeat Laforey-class destroyer which served with the Royal Navy during the First World War. Named after the character in the poem Marmion, the ship was originally to be called HMS Malice but was renamed prior to being launched on 9 October 1915. The destroyer joined the Harwich Force and took part in anti-submarine patrols, as well as escorting the monitors Erebus and Terror for their attacks on the canal gates at Zeebrugge and the port of Ostend in 1917. After the Armistice, the vessel was placed in reserve and sold to be broken up on 25 November 1921.

== Design and development ==
Lochinvar was one of twenty two L- or Laforey-class destroyers built for the Royal Navy. The design followed the preceding Acasta class but with improved seakeeping properties and armament, including twice the number of torpedo tubes. The destroyer was ordered but the British Admiralty under the Second War Programme as one of two repeat L class in November 1914.

The destroyer had a length overall of 268 feet 8 inches (81.89 m), a beam of 27 feet 8 inches (8.43 m) and a draught of 10 feet 6 inches (3.20 m). Displacement was 965 long tons (980 t) normal and 1,150 long tons (1,170 t) deep load. Power was provided by four Yarrow boilers feeding two Parsons steam turbines rated at 24,500 shaft horsepower (18,300 kW) and driving two shafts, to give a design speed of 29 knots (54 km/h; 33 mph). Three funnels were fitted. A total of 268 long tons (272 t) of oil was carried, giving a design range of 3,450 nautical miles (6,390 km; 3,970 mi) at 15 knots (28 km/h; 17 mph). Fuel consumption was 51.33 long tons (52.15 t) of oil in 24 hours during test. The ship's complement was 73 officers and ratings.

Armament consisted of three QF 4 in (102 mm) Mk IV guns on the ship's centreline, with one on the forecastle, one aft and one between the funnels. The guns could fire a shell weighing 31 pounds (14 kg) at a muzzle velocity of 2,177 feet per second (664 m/s). One single 7.7 mm (0.3 in) Maxim gun was carried. A single 2-pounder 40 mm (2 in) "pom-pom" anti-aircraft gun was later added. Torpedo armament consisted of two twin mounts for 21-inch (533 mm) torpedoes mounted aft. Capacity to lay four Vickers Elia Mk.4 mines was included, but the facility was never used. The vessel was equipped with a more advanced Barr and Stroud fire-control system than the majority of the class, modelled on that for the contemporary Admiralty M-class destroyers.

== Construction and career ==
Lochinvar was laid down by William Beardmore and Company at Dalmuir on the River Clyde on 9 January 1915 with the yard number 527. The vessel was intended to be a member of the M class and was laid down as Malice but to save time, the builders were instead ordered to follow the design of the L class and the ship was renamed accordingly on 15 February 1915. The vessel was named after the hero in poem Marmion. Constructed at the yard alongside sister ship Lassoo, Lochinvar was launched on 9 October and completed on 1 December.

On commissioning, Lochinvar joined the Ninth Destroyer Flotilla as part of the Harwich Force. The tasks that the destroyer was called to engage in varied greatly. On 5 August, the destroyer was called upon to undertake an anti-submarine patrol and formed part of a flotilla sent to protect the Dover Barrage on 26 October. During the following year, the destroyer formed part of the escort for the monitors Erebus and Terror for their attacks on the canal gates at Zeebrugge on 12 May and the port of Ostend on 5 June. The vessel was moved to Plymouth, joining the Fourth Destroyer Flotilla in July.

After the Armistice of 11 November 1918 that ended the war, the Royal Navy returned to a peacetime level of strength and both the number of ships and personnel needed to be reduced to save money. Lochinvar was initially stationed in reserve at Devonport alongside 56 other destroyers. The destroyer was subsequently considered for sale to the Finnish Navy but the purchase was made impossible by the provisions of the Washington Naval Treaty which denied the sale of superfluous warships by the signatories. Instead, on 25 November 1921, Lochinvar was sold to Hayes of Porthcawl and broken up.

== Pennant numbers ==
Pennant number	Date
G06	September 1915
F42	1916
F52	January 1918
H49	January 1919
