= HMS Marshal Ney =

World War I Royal Navy warship

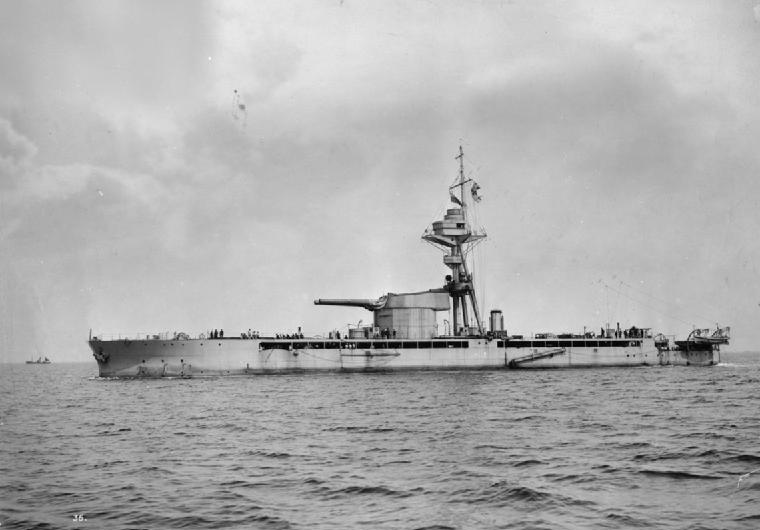
- Marshal Ney, August 1915

History

United Kingdom
- Name: Marshal Ney
- Namesake: Michel Ney
- Builder: Palmers, Jarrow
- Yard number: 859
- Laid down: January 1915
- Launched: 17 June 1915
- Commissioned: 31 August 1915
- Decommissioned: September 1919
- Out of service: 1957
- Renamed: From M.13, June 1915
- Fate: Scrapped, 6 October 1957

General characteristics
- Class & type: Marshal Ney-class monitor
- Displacement: 6,670 long tons (6,780 t) (standard); 6,900 long tons (7,000 t) (full load)
- Length: 355 ft 8 in (108.4 m) (o/a)
- Beam: 90 ft 3 in (27.5 m) (o/a)
- Draught: 10 ft 5 in (3.2 m)
- Installed power: 1,500 bhp (1,100 kW)
- Propulsion: 2 × shafts; 2 × diesel engines
- Speed: 6 knots (11 km/h; 6.9 mph)
- Range: 1,490 nmi (2,760 km; 1,710 mi) at 5.5 knots (10.2 km/h; 6.3 mph)
- Complement: 187
- Armament: As built: 1 × twin 15 in (380 mm) guns; 2 × single 12 pdr (3 in (76 mm)) AA guns; 2 × single 2 pdr (40 mm (1.6 in)) AA guns; 1916: 1 × single 9.2 in (234 mm) gun; 4 × single 6 in (152 mm) guns; 2 × single 12 pdr AA guns; 2 × single 2 pdr AA guns; 1918: 6 × single 6 in (152 mm) guns; 2 × single 3 in (76 mm) AA guns; 2 × single 2 pdr AA guns
- Armour: Belt: 4 in (102 mm); Barbette: 8 in (203 mm); Turret: 13 in (330 mm); Deck: 1–4 in (25–102 mm); Conning tower: 6 in (152 mm)

HMS Marshal Ney was the lead ship of her class of two monitors built for the Royal Navy during the First World War. Laid down as M13, she was renamed after the French field marshal of the Napoleonic Wars Michel Ney. After service in the First World War, she became a depot ship and then an accommodation ship. Between 1922 and 1947, she was renamed three times, becoming successively Vivid, Drake and Alaunia II. She was scrapped in 1957.

== Design ==
Designed for inshore operations along the sandbank-strewn Belgian coastline, Marshal Ney was equipped with two massive 15-inch (380 mm) naval guns in a single turret. Originally, these guns were to have been stripped from one of the battlecruisers Renown and Repulse after they were redesigned. However, the guns were not ready, and guns intended for the battleship Ramillies were used instead.

The diesel engines used by the Marshal Ney-class ships were a constant source of technical difficulty, hampering their use. Marshal Ney in particular was—in the words of Jane's Fighting Ships—"practically a failure", on account of her MAN diesel engines being so unreliable. A contemporary description of the engines by Admiral Reginald Bacon, commander of the Dover Patrol from April 1915, shows how fault-prone they were:

"Reliability both in officer and a ship is the first thing that an Admiral values. The Marshal Ney, judged by this standard, was a hopeless sinner; but her officers and men made up for her deficiencies. Her engines not infrequently exploded when asked to start; her engine-room was scarred as if by shrapnel from the fragments of burst cylinder heads, and the escapes of the engine-room staff were miraculous. Her Chief Engineer, Mr. Swan, stuck to the engines like a Trojan and almost overcame their bad habits; and really, when talking to him, you were almost converted to the opinion that just one little alteration would make them start next time the ship was required. Added to this, when they did not burst, they usually would not start, and when once started no one liked to stop them for fear of not being able to start them again. But, without exaggeration, the more they burst and the worse they behaved, the more Mr. Swan loved them and the more cheery Captain [Hugh J.] Tweedie became."

== Service ==
Assigned to the Dover Patrol, Marshal Ney served with her sister ship Marshal Soult.

Following her poor sea trials and continued poor operational performance off the Belgian coast, it was decided to remove her 15 inch guns and place them in the hull of a new monitor. Her 15 inch turret was removed at Elswick in January 1916, where it was re-engineered to fire up to an increased angle of 30 degrees. The turret was then shipped to Belfast and fitted to Terror. (Note: There is some confusion in the sources as to the fate of Ney's turret. Jane's Fighting Ships (1919) states that it was fitted to Erebus. However Buxton (2008) and Crossley (2013) both agree that Ney's turret was fitted to Terror while Erebus received a gun originally intended as a spare for Furious.) Terror would soon launch, and join the Dover Patrol together with her sister, Erebus.

Marshal Ney was then rearmed with a single 9.2 in (234 mm) gun and four 6 in (152 mm) guns, all of which had been taken from Terrible. However, another refit in 1916 to 1917 saw the 9.2 inch gun removed for use ashore in France. In the large gun's place her 6 inch armament was increased to six BL 6-inch Mk XI naval guns, which had been removed from Hibernia.

After her refit, Ney was relegated for service as a moored guardship at The Downs. She engaged German destroyers during a raid on Ramsgate on 27 April 1917, causing the German force to withdraw.

During 1919, Marshal Ney was used as a base ship at Queenborough, before being disarmed and becoming a depot ship at Fort Blockhouse from 1920. Renamed Vivid in July 1922, she then served as an accommodation ship for the stoker training section at Devonport, where she remained until 1957. She was again renamed Drake in January 1934, and Alaunia II in 1947.

She arrived at Thos. W. Ward's shipyard at Milford Haven on 6 October 1957 for breaking up.
