= Marshal Ney-class monitor =

1915 class of British monitors

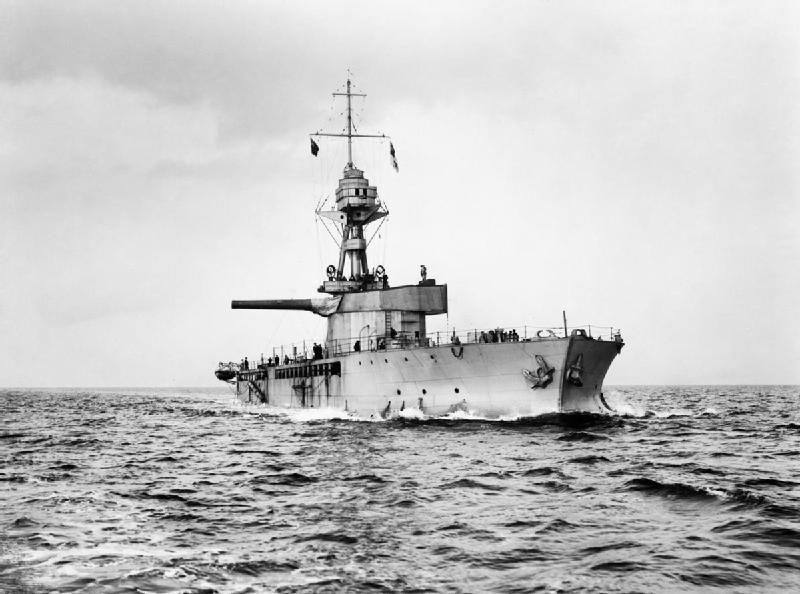
- Marshal Ney with guns trained to starboard

Class overview
- Name: Marshal Ney class
- Builders: Palmers Shipbuilding and Iron Company
- Operators: Royal Navy
- Preceded by: Lord Clive class
- Succeeded by: Erebus class; Gorgon class (coast defense ship)
- In service: 1915–1957
- In commission: 1915
- Completed: 2

General characteristics
- Type: Monitor
- Displacement: 6,670 tons (Standard); 6,900 tons (Full load)
- Length: 355 ft (108 m)
- Beam: 90 ft (27 m)
- Draught: 10 ft 5 in (3.18 m)
- Propulsion: Diesel engines (MAN for Ney, Vickers for Soult), 2 shafts, 1,500 hp
- Speed: 9 knots (17 km/h) designed; 6 knots (11 km/h) best actual
- Complement: 187
- Armament: 2 × 15-inch main guns in a single turret; 8 × 4 in (100 mm) guns; 2 × single mount 3-inch (76 mm) guns; 2 × 12-pounders
- Armour: Turret: 13 in (330 mm); Barbette: 8 in (203 mm); Belt: 4 in (102 mm)

The Marshal Ney class was a class of monitor built for the Royal Navy during the First World War.

== Design and development ==
The need for monitors for shelling enemy positions from the English Channel had become apparent only at the start of the war and they were designed with some haste. The design of monitors had been given by the Director of Naval Construction, Eustace Tennyson d'Eyncourt, to an Assistant Constructor, Charles S. Lillicrap (later himself to become Director). By the time the Marshal Neys came about some 33 monitors of various sorts had already been ordered. The redesign of the battlecruisers Renown and Repulse meant that there were now two modern 15-inch turrets available. The First Sea Lord Lord Fisher and Winston Churchill, First Lord of the Admiralty decided these should be used for two more monitors, initially M 13 and M 14, but then renamed after the French Napoleonic War marshals Jean-de-Dieu Soult and Michel Ney.

For machinery the two monitors received diesel engines, which were then a novelty – the majority of ships being steam powered. The use of diesels meant that they had no need of boiler rooms which went well with a low draught, nor of large funnels which reduced the amount of superstructure. These engines were originally designed for much smaller freighters and therefore they proved particularly slow and unreliable.

The turret was on multi-sided barbette made of individual flat plates, cutting down on the build time. The 4-inch (102 mm) guns were disposed along her sides for protection from smaller vessels, the 3-inch (76 mm) guns being for anti-aircraft use.

== Ships ==
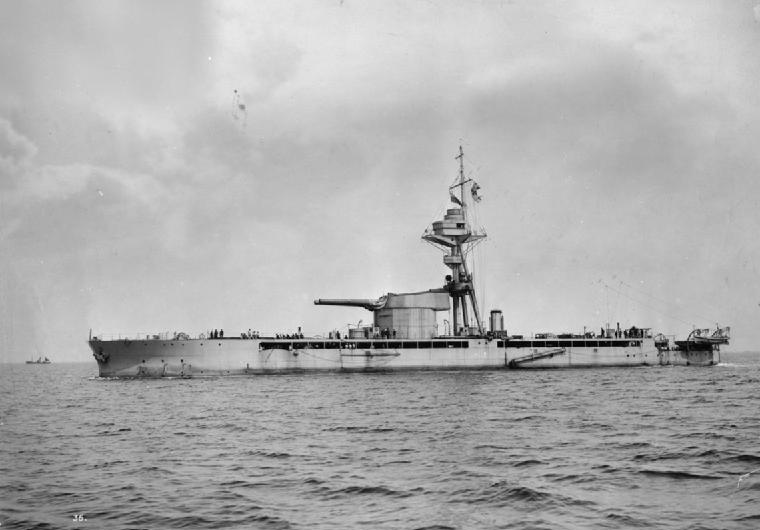
Marshal Ney underway 26 August 1915

- Marshal Soult

Built by Palmers, Newcastle
Launched June 1915
Completed August 1915
Served with the Dover Monitor Squadron, after the war became a gunnery training ship. At the start of World War II she was considered for recommissioning but instead her turret was removed for a new monitor, Abercrombie, and she became a headquarters ship. She was paid off and scrapped in 1946

- Marshal Ney

Built by Palmers, Newcastle
Launched August 1915
Completed November 1915
After trials the turret was removed for Erebus and she was regunned with 6- and 4-inch (102 mm) guns and acted as a guardship until the end of the war. She later acted as a depot ship gaining onshore buildings, and was renamed Alaunia II and was only finally scrapped in 1957

== Bibliography ==
- Bacon, Reginald (1919). The Dover Patrol 1915-1917. (2 vols.). New York: George H. Doran Co. Vol. 1 • Vol. 2
- Buxton, Ian (2008) [1978]. Big Gun Monitors: Design, Construction and Operations 1914–1945 (2nd Revised ed.). Barnsley, UK: Seaforth Publishing. ISBN 978-1-84415-719-8.
- Crossley, Jim (2013). Monitors of the Royal Navy; How the Fleet Brought the Great Guns to Bear. Barnsley, UK: Pen & Sword. ISBN 978-1-78383-004-6.
- Dittmar, F. J. & Colledge, J. J., "British Warships 1914-1919", (Ian Allan, London, 1972), ISBN 0-7110-0380-7
- Dunn, Steve R (2017). Securing the Narrow Sea: The Dover Patrol 1914–1918. Barnsley, UK: Seaforth Publishing. ISBN 978-1-84832-251-6.
- Friedman, Norman (2011). Naval Weapons of World War One: Guns, Torpedoes, Mines and ASW Weapons of All Nations; An Illustrated Directory. Barnsley: Seaforth Publishing. ISBN 978-1-84832-100-7.
- Gray, Randal (ed), "Conway's All the World's Fighting Ships 1906–1921", (Conway Maritime Press, London, 1985), ISBN 0-85177-245-5
- Parkes, Oscar; Prendergast, Maurice, eds. (1969) [1919]. Jane's Fighting Ships 1919. New York: Arco Publishing Co. ISBN 978-0-71534-716-4. OCLC 1902851.
