= Roberts-class monitor =

British naval ship class (1941–1965)

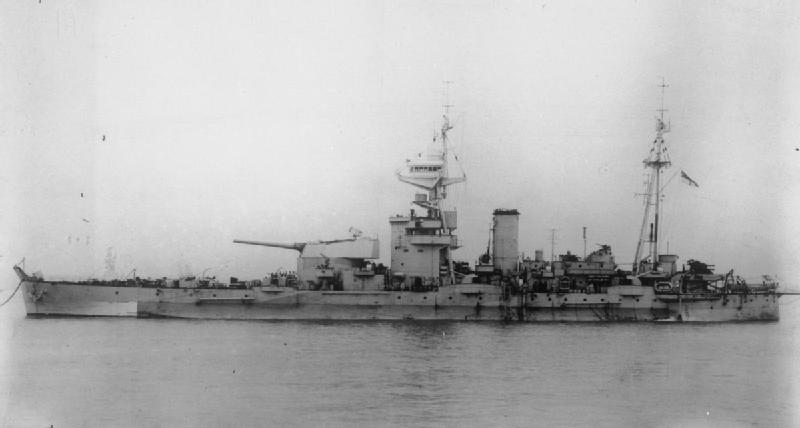

Class overview
- Name: Roberts
- Builders: John Brown; Vickers-Armstrongs
- Operators: Royal Navy
- Preceded by: Erebus class
- In commission: 1 April 1941
- Completed: 2
- Scrapped: 2

General characteristics
- Type: monitor
- Displacement: Roberts: 7,973 tons (Standard); 9,150 tons (Full load); Abercrombie: 8,536 tons (Standard); 9,717 tons (Full load)
- Length: 373 ft (114 m)
- Beam: 89 ft (27 m)
- Draught: Roberts: 13 ft 6 in (4.11 m); Abercrombie: 14 ft 5 in (4.39 m)
- Propulsion: 2 shaft, Parsons steam turbines, 2 boilers, 4,800 hp
- Speed: 12.5 knots (14.4 mph)
- Complement: 442 - 460
- Armament: 2 × BL 15-inch Mk I guns in a single turret; 8 × 4 in (100 mm) AA guns (4 × 2); 16 × QF 2-pdr "pom-pom"s (1 × 8, 2 × 4); 20 × Oerlikon 20mm guns
- Armour: Turret: 13 inch; Barbette: 8 inch; Belt: 4-5 inches
- Notes: Ships in class include: HMS Roberts (F40), HMS Abercrombie (F109)

The Roberts class of monitors of the Royal Navy consisted of two heavily gunned vessels built during the Second World War. They were the Roberts, completed in 1941, and Abercrombie, completed in 1943.

Features of the class were two 15-inch guns in a twin turret, shallow draught for operating inshore, broad beam to give stability (and also resistance to torpedoes and mines) and a high observation platform to observe fall of shot.

== Ships ==
Ship	Builder	Namesake	Laid down	Launched	Commissioned	Fate
Roberts	John Brown, Clydebank	Field Marshal Frederick Sleigh Roberts, 1st Earl Roberts	30 April 1940	1 February 1941	27 October 1941	Broken up at Inverkeithing, 1965
Abercrombie	Vickers-Armstrongs, Wallsend	Lieutenant General Sir Ralph Abercromby	26 April 1941	31 March 1942	5 May 1943	Broken up at Barrow-in-Furness, 1955

- HMS Roberts: Reused the turret of the World War I monitor Marshal Soult. Roberts provided bombardment support during Operation Torch in North Africa, where she was damaged by two 500 kg bombs. She was repaired in time to support the Allied invasion of Sicily, landings near Salerno, invasion of Normandy, and landing at Westkapelle.

One of Roberts' guns (formerly in HMS Resolution) is mounted outside the Imperial War Museum in Lambeth, South London, together with one from the battleship Ramillies. Roberts herself was sold for scrapping shortly after the war, but hired back by the Royal Navy as an accommodation ship at Devonport until 1965.

- HMS Abercrombie: She used a 15-inch gun turret originally built as a spare for HMS Furious. She was damaged by contact mines on several occasions while supporting the invasion of Italy, but was repaired. On completion of repairs, Abercrombie was sent for service in the Pacific, although the war ended before her arrival. She was used as a gunnery training and accommodation ship at Chatham after the war.

== Bibliography ==
- Buxton, Ian (2008) [1978]. Big Gun Monitors: Design, Construction and Operations 1914–1945 (2nd Revised ed.). Barnsley, UK: Seaforth Publishing. ISBN 978-1-84415-719-8.
- Crossley, Jim (2013). Monitors of the Royal Navy; How the Fleet Brought the Great Guns to Bear. Barnsley, UK: Pen & Sword. ISBN 978-1-78383-004-6.
