= Ralph Binney =

- Born: 14 October 1888; Cookham, Berkshire, England
- Died: 8 December 1944 (aged 56); London, England
- Cause of death: Fatally injured whilst apprehending burglars of a jeweller's shop
- Occupation: Captain (Royal Navy)
- Known for: Binney Memorial Medal
- Title: Captain

Captain Ralph Douglas Binney CBE (14 October 1888 – 8 December 1944) was a Royal Navy officer. He is commemorated today by the Binney Memorial Medal.

== Naval career ==
He was born in Cookham, Berkshire on 14 October 1888. He joined the Royal Navy as a naval cadet on 15 May 1903. Promoted to sub-lieutenant in 1907, lieutenant in 1908, and then lieutenant commander in 1916, he served throughout the Great War.

He was promoted from lieutenant commander to commander at the end of 1920. In the late 1920s he was commander (that is, second-in-command) (Note: For a large capital ship such as Royal Sovereign, a commander served as second-in-command to a captain.) of HMS Royal Sovereign. A Lieutenant Commander Stapleton recalled his first command as a midshipman in 1926, one of Royal Sovereign's small picket boats; (Note: Stapleton was later the author of a book on naval picket boats.) during which he damaged the ship's accommodation ladder. Binney "carpeted" him for this and stopped his shore leave for a month, "in order to perfect and practise the skill in handling power boats". His first command, in 1930, was the monitor HMS Marshal Soult.

In 1934, on the completion of a final shore appointment at the Admiralty he was placed on the retired list with the rank of captain.

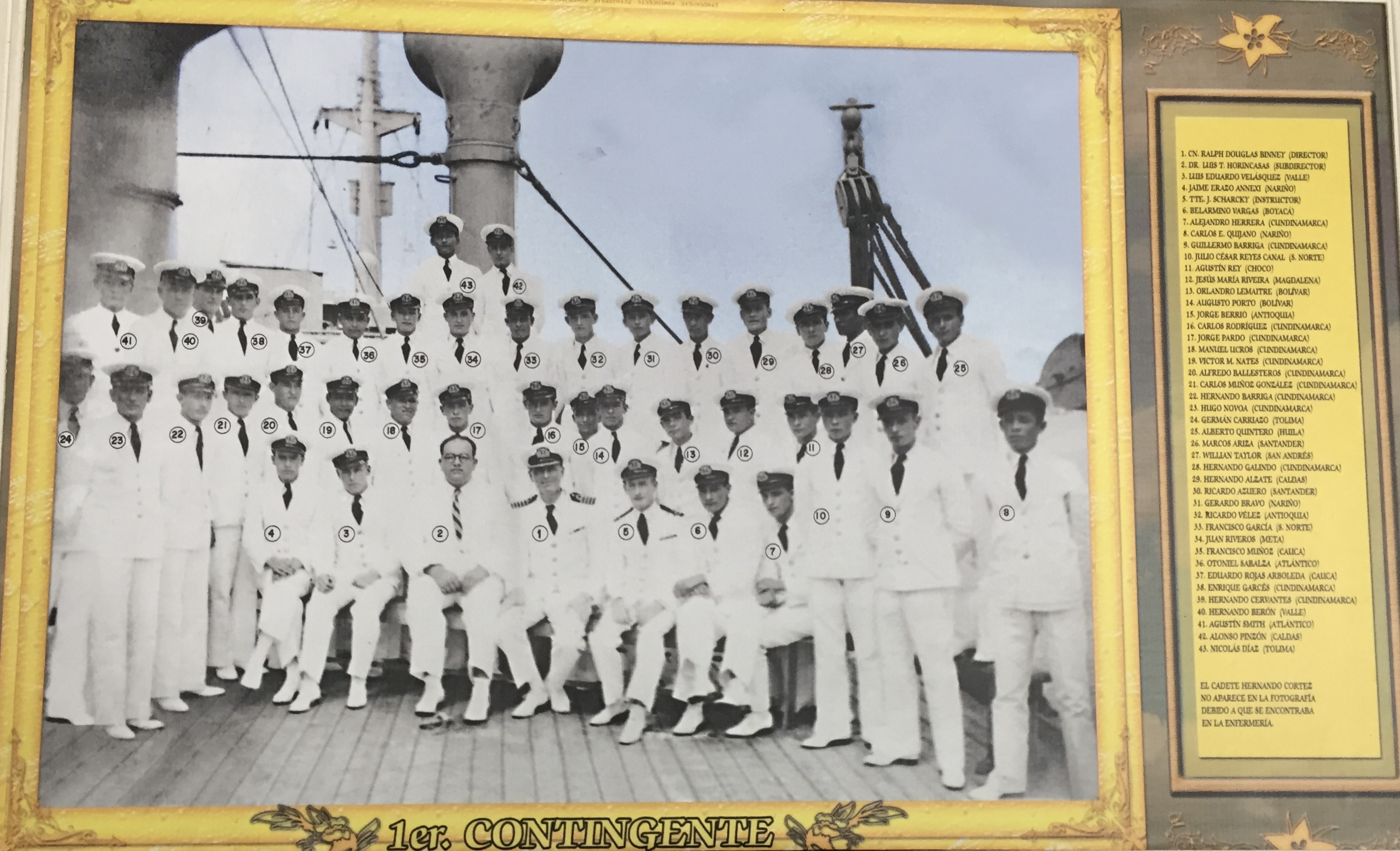
Captain Binney in 1935 as the first director of the Colombian Naval Academy along with the first class of cadets aboard the training ship MC Cúcuta.

From 1934 to 1939, he served with the Colombian Navy and was instrumental in the setting up of their naval cadet and officer training system, for which he was made a Commander of the Order of Boyaca. He was well regarded in Colombia and his name is still commemorated by one class within the Escuela Naval Almirante Padilla's intake of cadets being named the 'Binney' class.

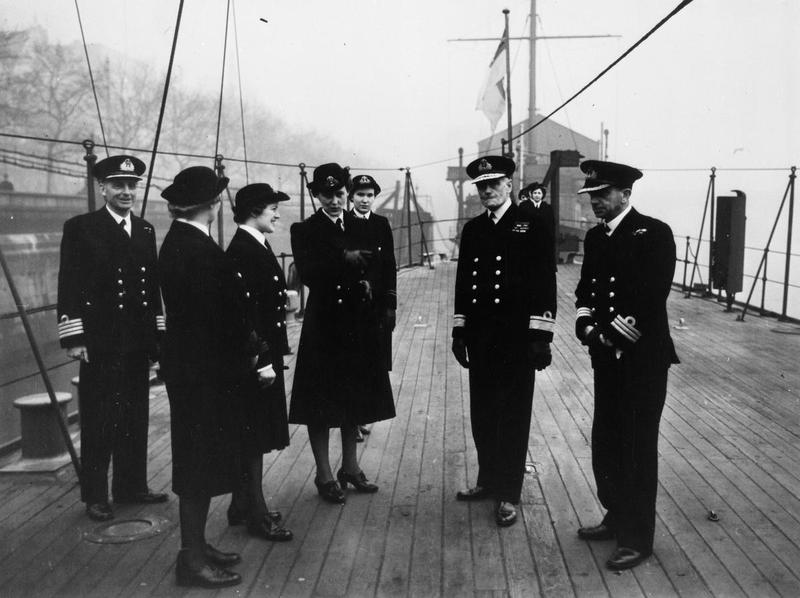
Binney (left) on HMS President in March 1943

On the outbreak of war in 1939, in common with many retired officers, he was recalled to the Royal Navy and had a series of staff appointments, most notably as flag captain of HMS Nile, the naval base at Alexandria. In June 1942, he was appointed CBE and was back in the UK serving as chief of staff to the Flag Officer-in-Charge, London. The admiral in charge at the time was Admiral Martin Dunbar-Nasmith.

== Death ==
On the night of 8 December 1944 he encountered a 'smash-and-grab' raid on Wordsleys' jewellers shop in Birchin Lane, EC3 (Note: 51.5129126°N 0.0863657°W) in the City of London. (Note: Birchin Lane runs between Cornhill and Lombard Street.) The burglars broke a window with an axe and grabbed a tray of rings from inside. They made off in a car; Binney tried to stop them but was run over and dragged beneath the car. The car drove over London Bridge and as far south as Tooley Street, with him still trapped beneath. Despite this he survived for another three hours and died in hospital. The robbers abandoned the car and were not caught immediately. The passenger, Thomas Jenkins (30) was charged with manslaughter and sentenced to eight years. The driver Ronald Hedley (26) was charged with murder and sentenced to death, but was reprieved on the day before his execution. The value of the jewellery stolen was £3,500, a very large sum in 1944.

Binney was cremated at Golders Green Crematorium, where he is commemorated on the Commonwealth War Graves Commission's cremation memorial.

== Memorials ==
Captain Binney's naval colleagues formed a trust:

'To award a medal for the bravest action performed in each calendar year in support of law and order in the areas controlled by the Metropolitan Police and the City of London Police by any person who is not a police officer or on duty as a member of the force.'

Since the first ceremony in 1947 more than 50 medals and hundreds of certificates have been handed out. The first posthumous award of the Binney Medal was in December 1965. Michael Munnelly, 23, was murdered by an 18 year old butcher in London, December 1964, whilst defending a milkman from a gang attempting to rob him.

A plaque to commemorate this was unveiled by Prince Philip, Duke of Edinburgh outside 22 Birchin Lane, in December 1986.

'This plaque was given by the Royal Navy in memory of Captain Ralph Douglas Binney CBE Royal Navy who, on 8 December 1944 died from injuries received, when bravely and alone he confronted violent men raiding a jeweller's shop in this lane and struggled to prevent their escape. To honour this courageous act, Captain Binney's fellow officers and other friends founded the Binney Memorial Awards for civilians of the City and Metropolitan areas of London who, in the face of great danger and personal risk, have followed Captain Binney's example and steadfastly upheld law and order.
Unveiled by HRH the Duke of Edinburgh KG KT on Thursday 4 December 1986.'

A charity, the Binney Memorial Medal Fund, was founded in 1962. This charity ceased in 2008. The scheme has since been extended to the whole country. The medal is still awarded today.
