= HMS Erebus (I02) =

1916 Erebus-class monitor

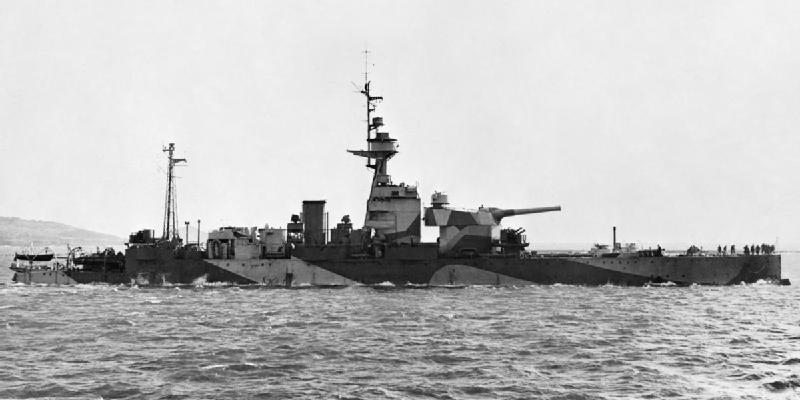
- HMS Erebus in 1944

History

United Kingdom
- Name: HMS Erebus
- Operator: Royal Navy
- Builder: Harland & Wolff, Govan
- Yard number: 492
- Laid down: 12 October 1915
- Launched: 19 June 1916
- Completed: 2 September 1916
- Commissioned: 2 September 1916
- Refit: August 1939
- Fate: Scrapped July 1946

General characteristics
- Class & type: Erebus-class monitor
- Displacement: 7,200 long tons (7,300 t)
- Length: 405 ft (123.4 m)
- Beam: 88 ft (26.8 m)
- Draught: 11 ft 8 in (3.56 m)
- Installed power: 6,000 ihp (4,500 kW)
- Propulsion: 2 × Reciprocating engines; 2 screws
- Speed: 12 knots (22 km/h; 14 mph)
- Complement: 226
- Armament: 2 × 15 in (381 mm) guns (1x2); 8 × 4 in (100 mm) guns (8x1); 2 × 12-pounder anti-aircraft guns; 2 × 3 in (76 mm) anti-aircraft guns; 2 × 2-pounder anti-aircraft guns; 4 × .303 in (7.7 mm) machine guns
- Armour: Bulkheads: 4 in (10.2 cm); Barbettes: 8 in (20.3 cm); Turrets: 13 in (33.0 cm); Magazines: 4 in (10.2 cm); Conning tower: 6 in (15.2 cm); Main deck: 2–4 in (5.1–10.2 cm); Torpedo protection bulges

HMS Erebus was a First World War monitor launched on 19 June 1916 and which served in both world wars. She and her sister ship Terror are known as the Erebus class. They were named after the two bomb vessels sent to investigate the Northwest Passage as part of Franklin's lost expedition (1845–1848), in which all 129 members eventually perished.

Monitors were designed as stable gun platforms with a shallow draught to allow operations close inshore in support of land operations, and were not intended to contest naval battles. Erebus was equipped with two 15 in (381 mm)/42 guns in a single forward turret mounted on a tall barbette to extend the range of fire to 40,000 yd (22.7 mi; 36.6 km).

The Erebus class were designed to outrange German heavy shore batteries and they were also fitted with highly effective anti-torpedo bulges on each side of the hull.

== Background ==
During the First World War, the Royal Navy developed several classes of ships which were designed to give close support to troops ashore through the use of naval bombardment. Termed monitors, they owed little to the monitors of the 19th century, though they shared the characteristics of poor seaworthiness, shallow draught and heavy armament in turrets. The size of the various monitor classes of the Royal Navy and their armaments varied greatly. The Marshal Ney class was the United Kingdom's first attempt at a monitor carrying 15 in (381 mm) guns. Following construction of the first two of the Marshall Ney-class, another four were ordered in May 1915, with the Harland and Wolff shipyard at Govan receiving a contract to construct two hulls, which were given yard numbers 492 and 493. However, all four were cancelled in June when it was realised that there were insufficient gun turrets to complete both the battleship, Royal Oak, and the monitors before 1917.

By August 1915, Marshal Ney, the first of her class, had revealed a very poor performance in her sea trials. The monitor's engines would not start reliably and were prone to stalling, making it impossible for the ship to achieve even the minimum standard for the trial of four hours of continuous sailing at full power. The vessel was also difficult to steer. Disappointed by the failure, the Admiralty began the design of a replacement class on 6 September, which incorporated lessons learned from all of the previous classes of monitor commissioned during the war. Some of the main modifications were an increase in the power supply to guarantee a speed of 12 knots (22 km/h; 14 mph) and a change to the angles and lines of the hull to improve steering. Another significant change was to raise the top of the anti-torpedo bulge above the waterline and reduce its width; both changes would improve the stability and maneuverability of the ship at sea. The bulge was fitted along each side of the ship and was intended to absorb the impact of any explosions. To maintain protection while reducing the bulge's width, its inner compartment was made water tight and filled with 70 steel tubes, rather than leaving the inner compartment open to the sea as in previous designs.

== Design and construction ==
The new design, which would later be named the Erebus-class, was for a vessel 405 ft (123.4 m) long, 88 ft 2 in (26.9 m) wide with a draught of 11 ft 8 in (3.6 m). It would have 8,450 long tons (8,590 t) loaded displacement, (Note: Official figures for displacement on completion were not recorded for either vessel of the Erebus-class, leading to historians estimating the true displacement from the completed design and manifest. Buxton suggests a figure of 8,450 long tons for loaded displacement at completion. An alternative figure of 7,200 long tons (7,300 t) was officially recorded for Terror's 1933 refit, though Buxton reports that this figure appears to be a mistake as it does not align with the ship's recorded loaded displacement for that period.) with a maximum operational speed of 13 knots (24 km/h; 15 mph) produced by triple-expansion steam engines with two shafts, and a crew of 204. Power would be provided by four Babcock & Wilcox water-tube boilers, which would generate a combined 6,000 ihp (4,500 kW). The monitors would have an operational range of 2,480 nmi (4,590 km; 2,850 mi) at a speed of 12 knots.

The ships would be armoured to a similar standard to the Abercrombie class, which were launched in April 1915. Deck armour would range from 1 in (25 mm) on the forecastle, through 2 in (51 mm) on the upper deck and 4 in (102 mm) over the magazine and belt. With the main 15 in guns being originally intended for use on a battleship, the armour for the turret was substantially thicker than elsewhere in the design; with 13 in (330 mm) on the front, 11 in (279 mm) on the other sides and 5 in (127 mm) on the roof. The main gun's barbette would be protected by 8 in (203 mm) of armour. The conning tower was protected by 6 in (152 mm) of armour on the sides and 2.5 in (64 mm) on the roof. Each anti-torpedo bulge was 13 ft (4 m) wide with an outer air-filled compartment 9 ft (2.7 m) wide and an inner compartment 4 ft (1.2 m) wide containing the steel tubes.

Orders for two vessels of the new design were placed with Harland and Wolff on 29 September with reinstated yard numbers 492 and 493, which were renamed respectively Erebus and Terror on 13 October. Erebus was laid down at Harland and Wolff's shipyard in Govan on 12 October 1915 and launched on 19 June 1916.

The ship's main armament consisted of two BL 15 in Mk I naval guns in a single forward turret. Erebus's turret was originally a spare for the battlecruiser Furious, which was prepared in case the new BL 18 in Mk I naval guns intended for the larger vessel were ineffective. (Note: There is some confusion in the sources as to the nature of the turrets installed on the Erebus-class monitors. Jane's Fighting Ships (1919) states that Marshall Ney's turret was fitted to Erebus. However Buxton (2008) and Crossley (2013) both agree that Ney's turret was fitted to Terror in Belfast while Erebus received at Clydebank a gun originally intended as a spare for Furious.) Learning from the earlier experience with Ney, the turrets were adjusted to increase elevation to 30 degrees, which would add greater firing range.

Erebus conducted sea trials on 1 September, during which the ship was faster than her sister at 14.1 knots (26.1 km/h; 16.2 mph) compared to 13.1 knots (24.3 km/h; 15.1 mph) for Terror. However, under service conditions the maximum speed that could be achieved for both vessels was 13 kn (24 km/h; 15 mph) with a clean hull or 12 kn (22 km/h; 14 mph) with a fouled hull. Erebus was completed and commissioned on 2 September.

== Service history ==
=== First World War ===
During the First World War, Erebus bombarded German naval forces based at the Belgian ports of Ostend and Zeebrugge.

On 28 October 1917, she was damaged by a remote controlled German FL-boat, and suffered the loss of 50 ft (15 m) of anti-torpedo bulge.

=== Inter-war period ===
In 1919, Erebus took part in the British Invasion of Russia providing gunfire support in the White Sea and in the Baltic Sea.

In 1921, she took part in gunnery trials against the surrendered German battleship SMS Baden. She then served as a gunnery training ship between the two world wars. After a refit completed in August 1939, she was earmarked as guardship at Cape Town, but due to the outbreak of World War II this did not occur.

=== Second World War ===
In the early war years, Erebus served with the Eastern Fleet and the Mediterranean Fleet, where she was used to run supplies to besieged Tobruk and bombard enemy concentrations. She was present at Trincomalee during the Japanese attack on the harbour there, receiving a near-miss hit from Japanese aircraft, suffering casualties. In 1943, she was damaged while bombarding Sicily during the Allied invasion of Sicily.

Erebus was used for coastal bombardment during the Normandy Landings on 6 June 1944, firing at the batteries at Barfleur and La Pernelle. She suffered one 15-inch gun destroyed due to a premature explosion of a high explosive round in the bore.

On 10 August 1944, she was used against the defenders of the harbour at Le Havre. She was damaged by the battery at Clos des Ronces and was out of action for some time. In November 1944, she supported Operation Infatuate, the amphibious assault on Walcheren, Netherlands.

She was scrapped in July 1946. It is believed that one of Erebus' 15-inch guns was used to equip Vanguard, the Royal Navy's last battleship.

== Bibliography ==
- Brown, David K. (2012) [1999]. The Grand Fleet; Warship Design and Development 1906–1922. Barnsley, UK: Seaforth Publishing. ISBN 978-1-84-832085-7.
- Buxton, Ian (2008) [1978]. Big gun Monitors: Design, Construction and Operations 1914–1945 (2nd Revised ed.). Barnsley: Pen & Sword. ISBN 978-1-84415-719-8.
- Crossley, Jim (2013). Monitors of the Royal Navy: How the Fleet Brought the Great Guns to Bear. Barnsley: Pen & Sword. ISBN 978-1-78-383004-6.
- Dodson, Aidan (2026). "The Cadet Training Ships of the Royal Navy". In Jordan, John (ed.). Warship 2026. Osprey Publishing. pp. 156–174. ISBN 978-1-4728-7259-3.
- Parkes, Oscar; Prendergast, Maurice, eds. (1969) [1919]. Jane's Fighting Ships, 1919. New York: Arco Publishing Co. ISBN 978-0-71-534716-4.
