= HMS Abercrombie (F109) =

Roberts-class monitor warship of the Royal Navy

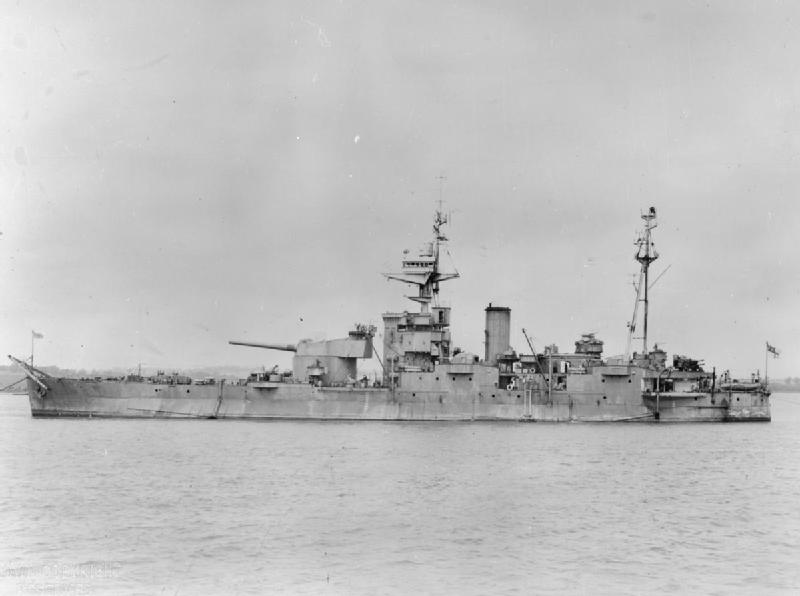

History

United Kingdom
- Name: HMS Abercrombie
- Ordered: 4 April 1941
- Builder: Vickers-Armstrongs, Newcastle upon Tyne
- Laid down: 26 April 1941
- Launched: 31 March 1942
- Commissioned: 5 May 1943
- Fate: Scrapped at Barrow 24 December 1954

General characteristics
- Class & type: Roberts class monitor
- Displacement: 7,850 long tons (7,980 t)
- Length: 373 ft 3 in (113.77 m) oa
- Beam: 89 ft 9 in (27.36 m)
- Draught: 11 ft (3.4 m)
- Installed power: 4,800 shp (3,600 kW)
- Propulsion: 2 × Parsons steam turbines; 2 × boilers; 2 × shafts
- Speed: 12.5 knots (23.2 km/h; 14.4 mph)
- Complement: 350
- Armament: 2 × 15-inch/42 Mk 1 guns (1x2); 8 × 4 in (100 mm) AA guns (4x2); 16 × 2-pounder "pom-pom"s (1x8, 2x4); 20 × 20 mm Oerlikon guns
- Armour: Turret: 13 in (33 cm); Barbette: 8 in (20 cm); Belt: 4–5 in (10–13 cm)

HMS Abercrombie was a Royal Navy Roberts-class monitor of the Second World War. She was the second monitor to be named after General Sir Ralph Abercrombie.

Abercrombie was built by Vickers-Armstrongs, Tyne. She was laid down on 26 April 1941, launched on 31 March 1942 and completed on 5 May 1943. She used a 15-inch gun turret originally built as a spare for Furious. (Although Furious was designed to be fitted with two single 18-inch gun turrets, twin 15-inch turrets were constructed as a stand-by in case the 18-inch turret proved to be unsuccessful.)

== Service history ==
On completion, Abercrombie deployed to the Mediterranean and in July 1943, she provided support at the Amphibious Battle of Gela during the Allied invasion of Sicily. On 9 September, Abercrombie was supporting the Allied landings near Salerno (Operation Avalanche), when she was damaged by a contact mine. She was repaired at the dockyard at Taranto in October and on completion, Abercrombie arrived at Malta on 15 August 1944. On 21 August 1944, whilst on an exercise southeast of Malta, she struck two mines and was again damaged.

On completion of her repairs in July 1945, Abercrombie was dispatched to the Indian Ocean to support Operation Mailfist, the planned liberation of Singapore. She was near Aden at the time of the Japanese surrender on 15 August, but was not recalled until 11 September, by which time she was approaching the Seychelles Islands. Abercrombie returned to Sheerness on 2 November 1945. Abercrombie was subsequently used for gunnery training and also as an accommodation ship until 1954. She was scrapped at Barrow on 24 December 1954.
