= Erebus-class monitor =

Two ship class of 20th century Royal Navy monitors

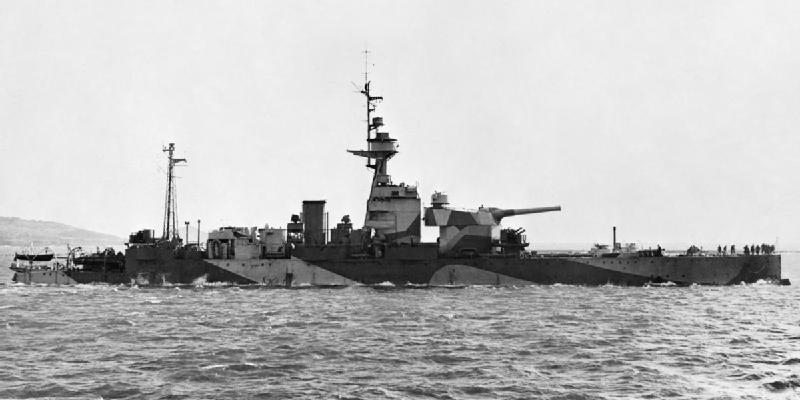
- HMS Erebus

Class overview
- Name: Erebus-class monitor
- Builders: Harland & Wolff
- Operators: Royal Navy
- Preceded by: Marshal Ney class; M29 class (gunboat)
- Succeeded by: Roberts class
- In service: 1916–1946
- In commission: August 1916
- Completed: 2
- Lost: 1
- Scrapped: 1

General characteristics
- Type: Monitor
- Displacement: 8,000 tons (standard); 8,450 tons (full load)
- Length: 405 ft (123 m)
- Beam: 88 ft (27 m)
- Draught: 11 ft 8 in (3.56 m)
- Propulsion: 4 oil-fired boilers, 2 shaft reciprocating engines, 6,000 hp (4,500 kW)
- Speed: 12 knots (22 km/h; 14 mph)
- Complement: 204, rising to 315 later
- Armament: Original: 2 × 15-inch /42 Mk 1 guns in a single turret; 2 × single 6-inch (150 mm) guns; 4 × single 3-inch (76 mm) anti-aircraft guns; After refit: 2 × 15-inch /42 Mk 1 guns in a single turret; 8 × single mount 4-inch (102 mm) BL Mk IX guns; 2 × single mount 3-inch (76 mm) anti-aircraft guns; 2 × quadruple .50-inch (12.7 mm) Vickers machine gun AA mounts
- Armour: Belt and bulkheads: 4 inch; Barbette: 8 inch; Turret: 13 inch; Deck: 4 inch; Anti-torpedo bulges: 9 ft (2.7 m) wide

The Erebus class of warships was a class of 20th century Royal Navy monitors armed with a main battery of two 15-inch /42 Mk 1 guns in a single turret. It consisted of two vessels, Erebus and Terror, named after the two ships lost in the Franklin Expedition. Both were launched in 1916 and saw active service in World War I off the Belgian coast. After being placed in reserve between the wars, they served in World War II, with Terror being lost in 1941 and Erebus surviving to be scrapped in 1946.

== Ships ==
- Erebus was built by Harland & Wolff, Govan. She was laid down on 12 October 1915, launched on 19 June 1916 and commissioned in September 1916. After seeing service in both World Wars, Erebus was scrapped in 1946.
- Terror was built by Harland & Wolff, Belfast. She was laid down on 26 October 1915, launched on 18 May 1916 and commissioned in August 1916. She saw extensive service in both World Wars. In the Second World War Terror served in the Mediterranean in support of the North Africa campaign. She sunk in Benghazi harbour on 23 February 1941, after being damaged by Luftwaffe Junkers Ju 88 bomber while operating as anti-aircraft defence.

== Service ==
The class was to see most of its service for shore bombardment (naval gunfire support, "NGS") role. During World War I, they operated off the German-occupied Belgian coast bombarding naval forces based at Ostend and Zeebrugge including the Zeebrugge raid. Erebus was damaged by a remote controlled explosive motor boat and Terror was torpedoed by motor torpedo boats.

Both ships were placed in reserve between the wars but returned to service in World War II, when they were again used to provide fire support to British troops.

Erebus participated in the invasion of Normandy June 1944 as part of Task Force O off Omaha Beach.

== In popular culture ==
Douglas Reeman's 1965 novel H.M.S. Saracen is a fictional account of the service of an Erebus class monitor in the Mediterranean Sea in both World Wars.

== Bibliography ==
- Bacon, Reginald (1919). The Dover Patrol 1915–1917. (2 vols.). New York: George H. Doran Co. Vol. 1 • Vol. 2
- Buxton, Ian (2008) [1978]. Big Gun Monitors: Design, Construction and Operations 1914–1945 (2nd Revised ed.). Barnsley, UK: Seaforth Publishing. ISBN 978-1-84415-719-8.
- Crossley, Jim (2013). Monitors of the Royal Navy; How the Fleet Brought the Great Guns to Bear. Barnsley, UK: Pen & Sword. ISBN 978-1-78383-004-6.
- Dittmar, F. J. & Colledge, J. J., "British Warships 1914–1919", (Ian Allan, London, 1972), ISBN 0-7110-0380-7
- Dunn, Steve R (2017). Securing the Narrow Sea: The Dover Patrol 1914–1918. Barnsley, UK: Seaforth Publishing. ISBN 978-1-84832-251-6.
- Friedman, Norman (2011). Naval Weapons of World War One: Guns, Torpedoes, Mines and ASW Weapons of All Nations; An Illustrated Directory. Barnsley: Seaforth Publishing. ISBN 978-1-84832-100-7.
- Gray, Randal (ed), "Conway's All the World's Fighting Ships 1906–1921", (Conway Maritime Press, London, 1985), ISBN 0-85177-245-5
- Parkes, Oscar; Prendergast, Maurice, eds. (1969) [First published 1919]. Jane's Fighting Ships 1919. New York: Arco Publishing Co. ISBN 978-0-71534-716-4. OCLC 1902851.
