= HMS Roberts (F40) =

Warship

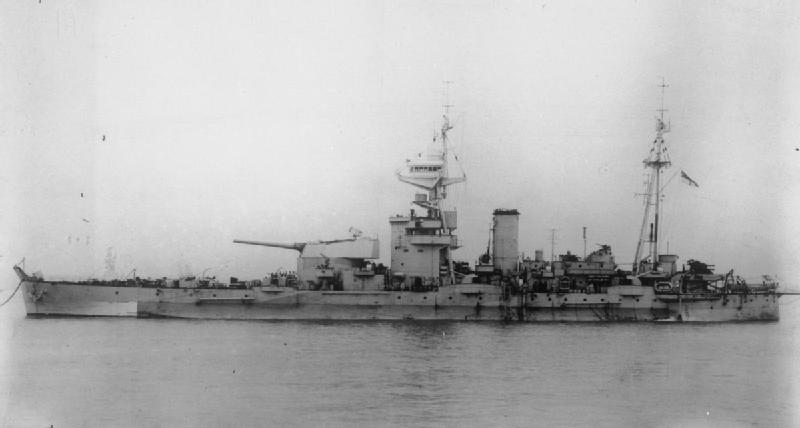

History

United Kingdom
- Name: HMS Roberts
- Builder: John Brown & Company, Clydebank
- Laid down: 30 April 1940
- Launched: 1 February 1941
- Commissioned: 27 October 1941
- Fate: Sold June 1965 and scrapped

General characteristics
- Class & type: Roberts-class monitor
- Displacement: 7,970 long tons (8,100 t)
- Length: 373 ft 3 in (113.77 m) oa
- Beam: 89 ft 9 in (27.36 m)
- Draught: 11 ft (3.4 m)
- Installed power: 4,800 shp (3,600 kW)
- Propulsion: 2 × Parsons steam turbines; 2 × boilers; 2 × shafts
- Speed: 12.5 knots (23.2 km/h; 14.4 mph)
- Complement: 350
- Armament: 2 × 15 in (380 mm)/42 Mk 1 guns (1x2); 8 × 4 in (100 mm) anti-aircraft guns (4x2); 16 × 2-pdr "pom-pom" anti-aircraft guns (1x8, 2x4); 20 × 20 mm anti-aircraft cannons
- Armour: Turret: 13 in (330 mm); Barbette: 8 in (200 mm); Belt: 4–5 in (100–130 mm)

HMS Roberts was a Royal Navy Roberts-class monitor of the Second World War. She was the second monitor to be named after Field Marshal Frederick Roberts, 1st Earl Roberts.

Built by John Brown & Company, of Clydebank, she was laid down 30 April 1940, launched 1 February 1941 and completed on 27 October 1941. She reused the twin 15-inch gun turret of the First World War monitor Marshal Soult.

== Service history ==
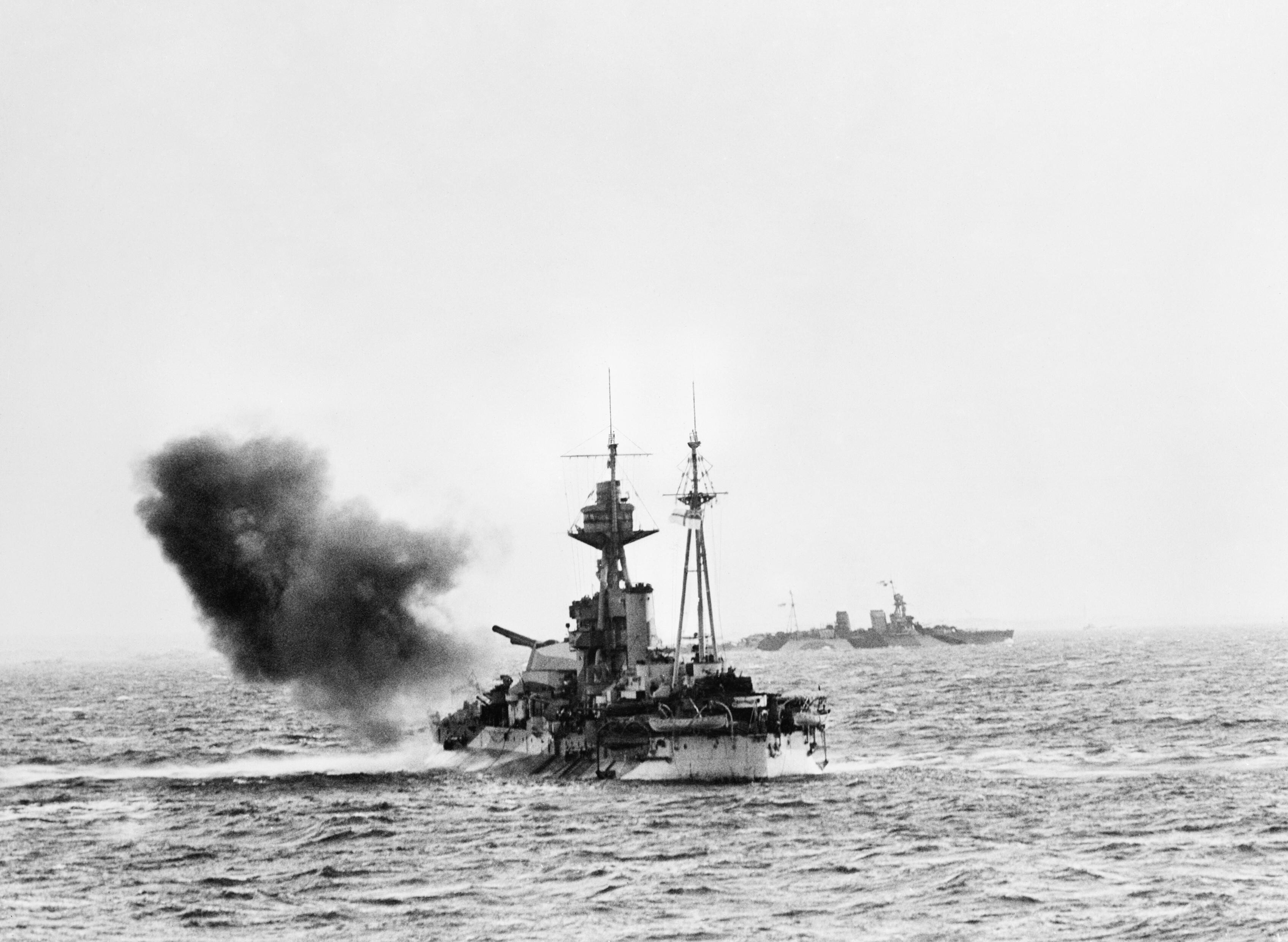
HMS Roberts shelling German shore batteries, 6 June 1944. HMS Frobisher is in the background.

Roberts provided bombardment support during Operation Torch in North Africa, where she was damaged by two 500 kg (1,100 lb) bombs in the Battle of Béjaïa. She was repaired in time to support Operation Husky (the invasion of Sicily) and the Allied landings near Salerno (Operation Avalanche). During the D-Day landings, she was controlled from the headquarters ship HMS Largs also positioned off Sword Beach. She also took part in the Walcheren operations.

In July 1945, Roberts departed the United Kingdom for the Indian Ocean to support Operation Mailfist, the planned liberation of Singapore. She was near Port Said at the time the Japanese surrender on 15 August, but was not recalled until 11 September by which time she had reached Kilindini Harbour in Kenya. She eventually reached Plymouth on 22 November.

Roberts was sold for scrap shortly after the war, but hired back by the navy as an accommodation ship at Devonport until 1965. She was sold for scrap again in July 1965, finally berthing at Thos. W. Ward in Inverkeithing for break up in early August.

One of Roberts' weapons (originally installed on the battleship Resolution) is mounted outside the Imperial War Museum in Lambeth, south London, together with one from the battleship Ramillies.

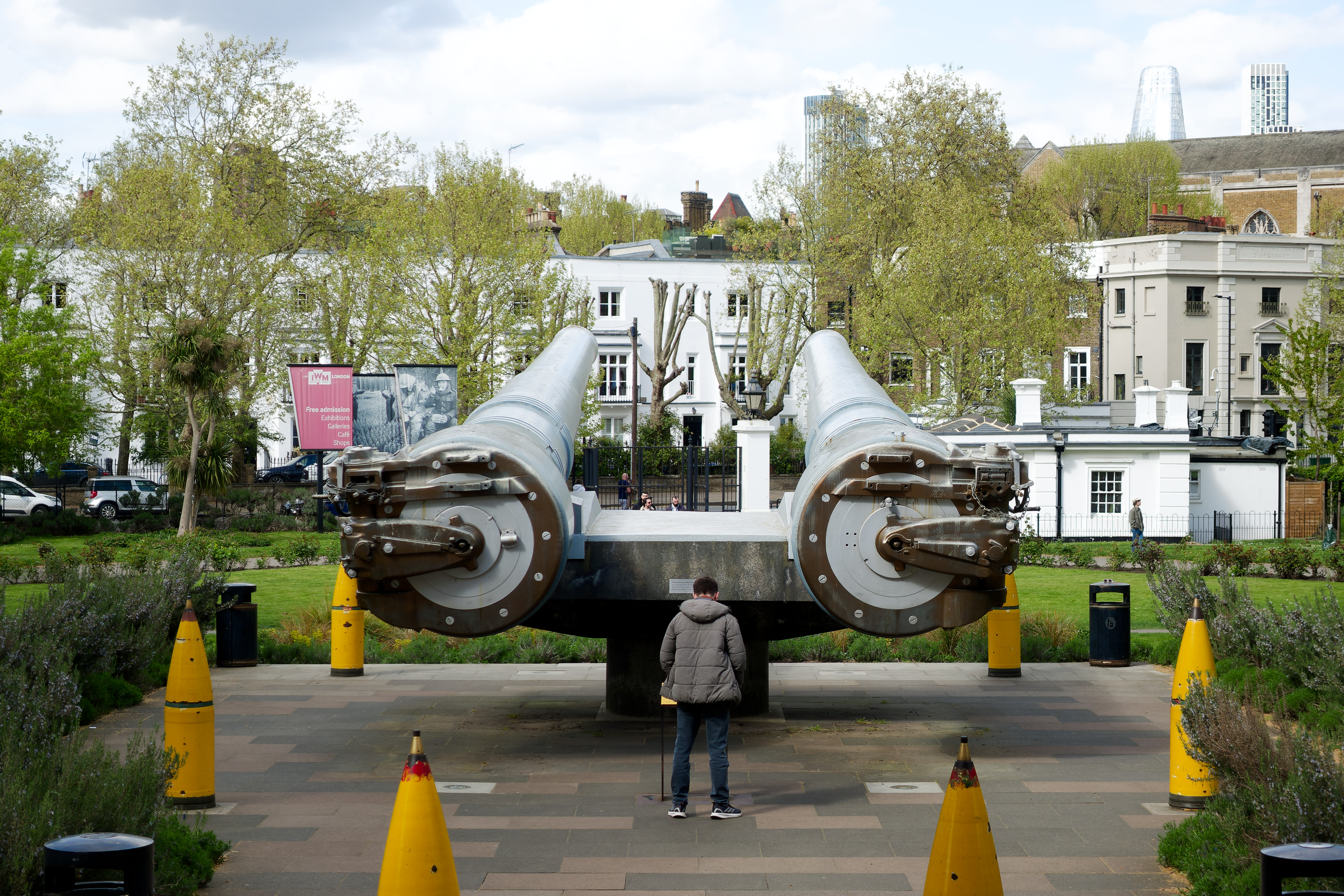
HMS Roberts main gun (photo right) at the Imperial War Museum, London.

== Notes ==
Hart, Stephen A. The Clearing of the Scheldt Estuary and the Liberation of Walcheren 2 October - 7 November 1944 Second World War 60th Anniversary, number 8, page 15. Central Office of Information, 2005.
