= HMS Marshal Soult =

1915 Marshal Ney-class monitor

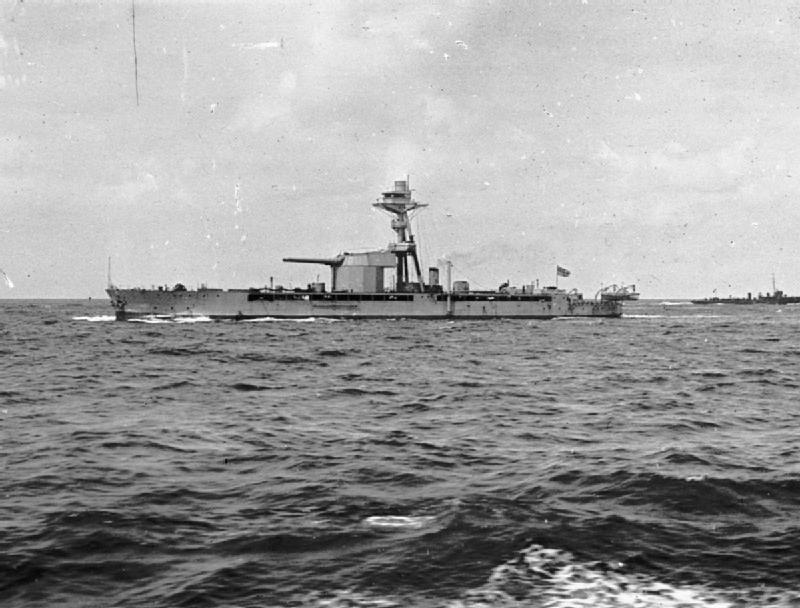
- HMS Marshal Soult

History

United Kingdom
- Name: HMS Marshal Soult
- Namesake: Marshal Jean-de-Dieu Soult
- Builder: Palmers, Jarrow
- Launched: 24 August 1915
- Commissioned: August 1915
- Fate: Sold 10 July 1946

General characteristics
- Class & type: Marshal Ney-class monitor
- Displacement: 6,670 long tons (6,780 t) (standard); 6,900 long tons (7,000 t) (full load)
- Length: 340 ft (100 m) (p.p.); 355 ft 7.2 in (108.387 m) (o/a)
- Beam: 90 ft 3 in (27.51 m)
- Draught: 10 ft 6 in (3.20 m)
- Installed power: 1,898 hp (1,415 kW) (trials); 1,500 hp (1,100 kW) (service)
- Propulsion: 2 × Vickers diesel engines; 2 × screws
- Speed: 9 kn (10 mph; 17 km/h) (design); 6.6 kn (7.6 mph; 12.2 km/h) (trials); 6 kn (6.9 mph; 11 km/h) (service)
- Capacity: Diesel fuel: 235 short tons (213 t) (maximum)
- Complement: 228
- Armament: As built: 2 × BL 15 in (380 mm)/42 cal Mk I guns; 2 × QF 12-pounder (3 in (76 mm))/50 cal 18 cwt Mk I guns; 1 × 3-pounder (47 mm (1.9 in)) anti-aircraft gun; 1917: 2 × BL 15 in (380 mm)/42 cal Mk I guns; 2 × QF 6 in (150 mm) MK I guns; 2 × QF 12-pounder (3 in (76 mm))/50 cal 18 cwt Mk I guns; 1 × 3-pounder (47 mm (1.9 in)) anti-aircraft gun; 1918: 2 × BL 15 in (380 mm)/42 cal Mk I guns; 8 × BL 4 in (100 mm)/50 cal Mk IX guns; 2 × QF 3 in (76 mm) 20 cwt anti-aircraft guns; 2 × 12-pounder (3 in (76 mm)) anti-aircraft guns
- Armour: Bulkheads: 4 in (10 cm) (fore and aft); Deck: 1 in (2.5 cm) (forecastle); 1.5–2 in (3.8–5.1 cm) (upper deck); 3 in (7.6 cm) (lower deck, bow); 1.5 in (3.8 cm) (lower deck, stern); 1–4 in (2.5–10.2 cm) (box citadel over magazine); Barbettes: 8 in (20 cm); Turrets: 4.5–13 in (11–33 cm); Conning tower: 6 in (150 mm); 1 in (25 mm) (navigator's position)

HMS Marshal Soult was a Royal Navy Marshal Ney-class monitor constructed in the opening years of the First World War. Laid down as M14, she was named after the French general of the Napoleonic Wars Marshal Jean-de-Dieu Soult. She served in both World Wars and was decommissioned in 1946.

== Design ==
Designed for inshore operations along the sandbank strewn Belgian coastline, Marshal Soult was equipped with two 15-inch (380 mm) battleship guns. Originally, these guns were to have been stripped from one of the battlecruisers Renown and Repulse after they were redesigned. However the guns were not ready, and guns intended for the battleship Ramillies were used instead.

The diesel engines used by the ships were a constant source of technical difficulty, restricting their use.

== Service ==
Marshal Soult performed numerous bombardment operations against German positions in Flanders, including during the First Ostend Raid in April 1918. In October 1918, she became a tender to the gunnery school HMS Excellent at Portsmouth and in March 1919 undertook a similar role at Devonport before paying off in March 1921. Recommissioned in 1924, she moved to Chatham in April 1926 as a training ship.

Her armament was removed in March 1940 and was later fitted to the new Roberts-class monitor Roberts, which was completed in 1941.

In the year of her launch 1915, Caretta, an Admiralty Pinnace was assigned to her.

She served throughout the Second World War as a depot ship for trawlers at Portsmouth until being sold on 10 July 1946 and scrapped at Troon.

== See also ==
- Commander R.D. Binney: his first command, in 1930, was the Marshal Soult
