= BL 15-inch Mk I naval gun =

British naval gun produced 1912–1918

BL 15-inch Mark I naval gun
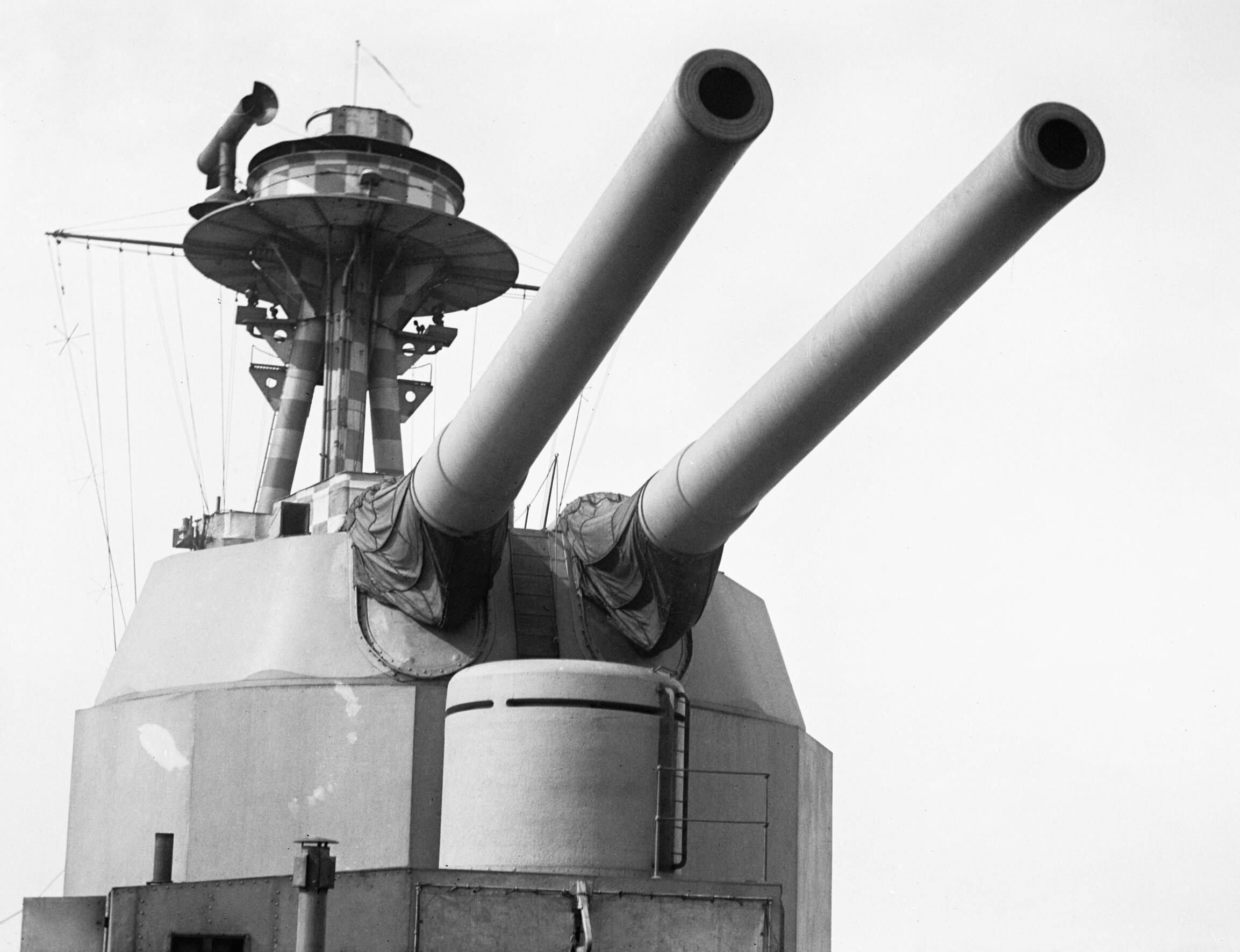
- As mounted on monitor HMS Terror, 1915
- Type: Naval gun
- Place of origin: United Kingdom

Service history
- In service: 1915–1959
- Used by: United Kingdom
- Wars: World War I, World War II, Cold War

Production history
- Designed: 1912
- Produced: 1912–1918
- No. built: 186

Specifications
- Mass: 100 long tons (100 t)
- Length: 650.4 inches (16.52 m)
- Barrel length: 630 inches (16 m) L42
- Shell: separate charges and shell
- Shell weight: 1,938 pounds (879 kg)
- Calibre: 15-inch (381.0 mm)
- Recoil: 46 inches (1.2 m)
- Rate of fire: 2 rounds per minute
- Muzzle velocity: 2,450–2,640 feet per second (750–800 m/s), with supercharge
- Maximum firing range: 33,550 yards (30,680 m) (Mk XVIIB or Mk XXII streamlined shell @ 30°) HMS Vanguard – 37,870 yards (34,630 m) @ 30°, with supercharges.

The BL 15-inch Mark I succeeded the BL 13.5-inch Mk V naval gun. It was the first British 15-inch (380 mm) gun design and the most widely used and longest lasting of any British designs, and arguably the most successful heavy gun ever developed by the Royal Navy. It was deployed on capital ships from 1915 until 1959 and was a key Royal Navy gun in both World Wars.

== Design ==
Diagram showing gun barrel construction

=== Gun ===
The BL 15-inch Mk I, designed by Vickers, Son, and Maxim in 1912, was an enlarged version of the successful BL 13.5-inch Mk V naval gun. It was specifically intended to arm the new Queen Elizabeth-class battleships as part of the British response to the new generation of Dreadnought battleships Germany was building, during the naval arms race leading up to World War I. Due to the urgency of the times, the normally slow and cautious prototype and testing stages of a new gun's development were bypassed, and it was ordered straight from the drawing board. Despite its hurried development process, the gun met all expectations and was a competitive battleship main armament throughout both World Wars. According to an American report produced after World War II, the British 15 inch Mk I was the most reliable and accurate battleship main armament of the war, though other guns and mountings had superior individual features.

Animation representing the loading cycle of the Mark I turret for the BL 15 inch Mark I.

The barrel was 42 calibres long (i.e., length of bore was 15 in x 42 = 630 in) and was referred to as "15 inch/42". Overall length of gun: 650.4 inches, Weight of gun, excluding breech mechanism: 97 tons 3cwt. Weight of breech mechanism: 2 tons 17cwt. Rifling: polygroove, 76 grooves, uniform right-hand twist of one turn in 30 calibres. This wire-wound gun fired at a muzzle velocity of 2,450 ft/s (750 m/s) (4 crh shell), 2,640 ft/s (6 crh shell) with supercharge. Weight of shell: 1,920 lbs (4 AP crh shell), 1,938 lbs (6 crh AP shell – 1937). Weight of charge: 428 lbs cordite, 490 lbs cordite for supercharge. The firing life of a 15-inch gun was approximately 335 full charge firings using standard charges, after which it had to be re-lined.

=== Mounting ===
All shipboard mounts of the gun were in twin turrets. All mountings were designated Mk I, with an as-built maximum elevation of 20°, though some were subject to later modifications. HMS Hood, however, had its guns in a unique mounting, designated Mk II. Incorporating experience from the Battle of Jutland, the Mk II mounting had a maximum elevation of 30°, thus increasing the maximum range. In the 1930s a modification of the Mk I mounting, designated the Mk I (N), was introduced for use in those capital ships that were completely reconstructed. The Mk I (N) mounting also increased the maximum elevation from 20° to 30°. Maximum range in shipboard mountings was 33,550 yards (30,680 m) (30° elevation). During World War II unreconstructed older battleships, with gun elevation limited to 20°, were supplied with supercharges to increase their maximum range to 29,930 yards (27,370 m) at 2,638 ft/s (804 m/s) using the Mk XVIIB or Mk XXII projectile, while HMS Vanguard could theoretically range to 37,870 yards (34,630 m) while using supercharges at a gun elevation of 30°. Coastal artillery mountings with higher elevations could reach 44,150 yards (40,370 m). The Mk I mounting had a revolving weight of 750 tons (1915) and 785 tons (1935). The Mk I (N) had a revolving weight of 815 tons; the Mk I (N) RP12 mounts of HMS Vanguard had a revolving weight of 855 tons. The Mk II mounts of HMS Hood had a revolving weight of 860 tons.

== In service employment ==
=== In battle ===
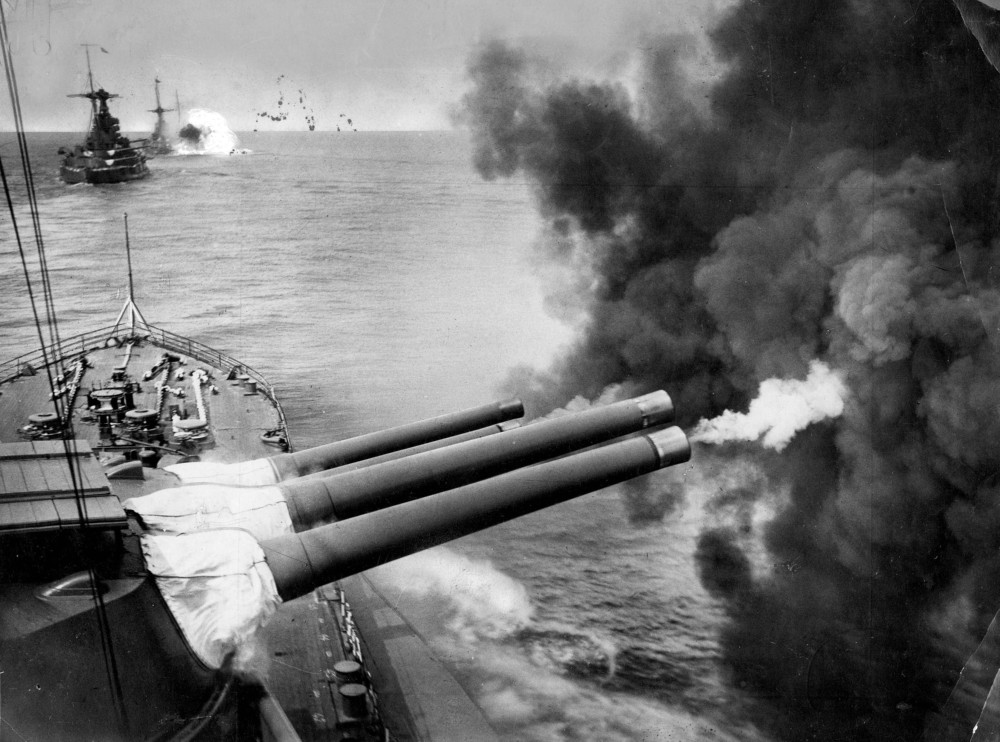
BL 15-inch Mk I naval guns firing, interwar view of a Queen Elizabeth-class battleship - the right-hand gun in each turret has just fired and the degree of recoil is evident

The BL 15-inch Mark I gun proved its effectiveness at the Battle of Jutland in 1916, scoring hits out to 19,500 yards (17,800 m), a record for naval gunnery at that time.

In World War II the gun was responsible for the longest range shell-hit ever scored by one battleship on another in combat. At the Battle of Calabria on 9 July 1940, HMS Warspite gained a hit on the Italian battleship Giulio Cesare with her first salvo at 26,400 yards (24,100 m). In the Attack on Mers-el-Kébir, when the French fleet was largely neutralised following the fall of France to the Germans, the BL 15-inch Mark I gun (arming HMS Hood, HMS Valiant and HMS Resolution) was responsible for the destruction by a magazine explosion of the old battleship Bretagne, and the disabling and beaching (deliberate running aground in shallow water) of the old battleship Provence and the new battleship Dunkerque. Dunkerque's main 225mm armour belt was twice penetrated by 15-inch shells, which destroyed its fighting and steaming abilities.

=== Warships ===
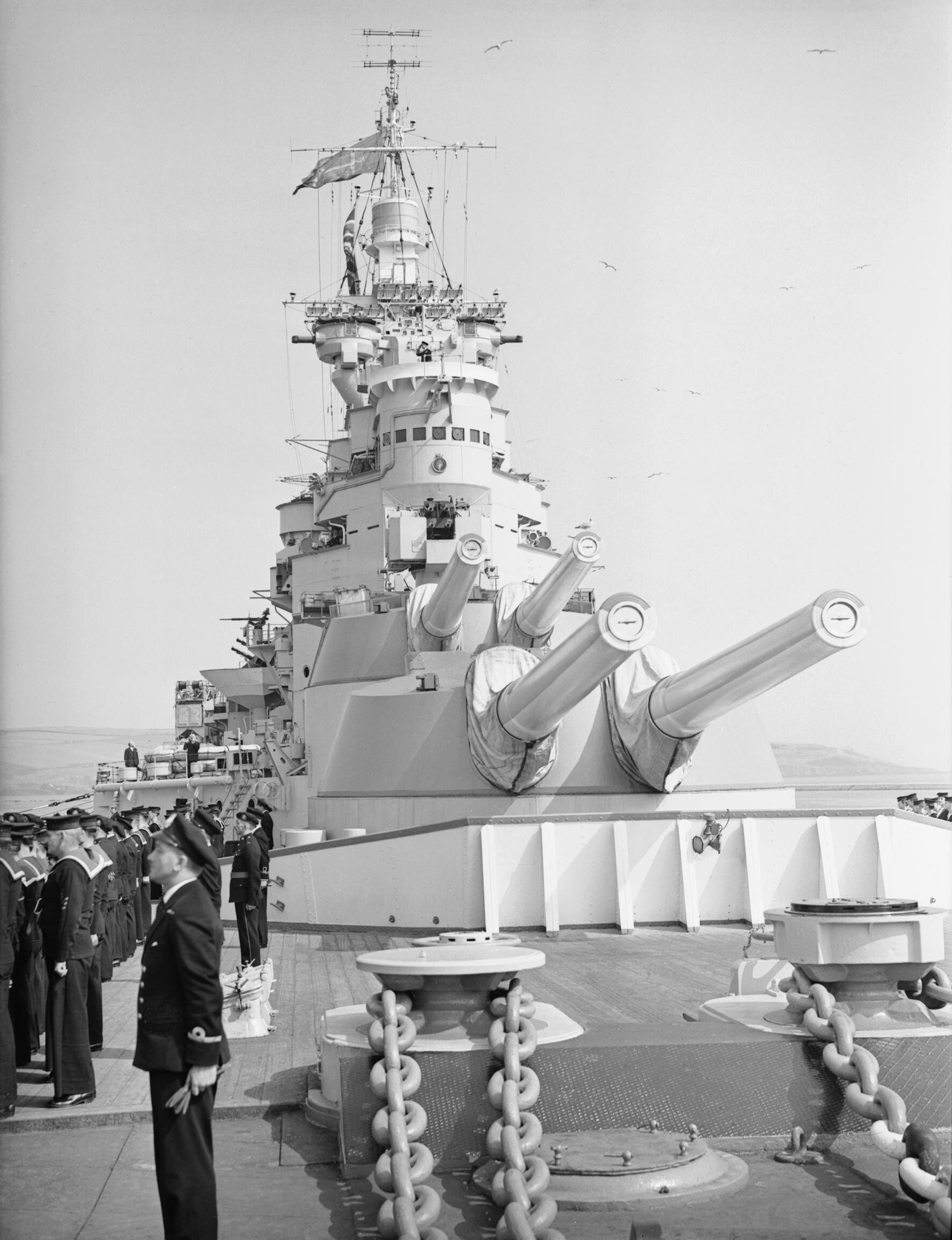
Forward BL 15-inch Mark I (N) mounts of the battlecruiser HMS Renown c. 1945

These guns were used on several classes of battleships from 1914 until HMS Vanguard, the last battleship to be built for the Royal Navy, and the last to be completed by any nation, in 1946.

Warships armed with the BL 15-inch Mark I gun:

- Queen Elizabeth-class battleships (Five ships with eight guns each – 3 ships converted to Mk I (N))
- Revenge-class battleships (Five ships with eight guns each)
- Renown-class battlecruisers (Two ships with six guns each – 1 ship converted to Mk I (N))
- HMS Hood – battlecruiser (Eight guns, Mk II mounting)
- Courageous-class battlecruisers (Two ships with four guns each)
- Erebus-class monitors (Two ships with two guns each)
- Marshal Ney-class monitors (Two ships with two guns each)
- Roberts-class monitors (Two ships with two guns each)
- HMS Vanguard – battleship (Eight guns in mountings taken from Courageous and Glorious converted to Mk I (N), with additional armour, designated: Mk I (N) (RP12). The turret supports were designed to withstand supercharge firings.Vanguard was unique among British battleships in having remote power control (RPC) for her main battery turrets.

=== Coastal batteries ===
- Two coastal guns ("Clem" and "Jane") were mounted near Wanstone Farm in Kent in the 1940s, and were used extensively for cross-Channel fire throughout the war.
- Five guns were mounted in Singapore at Johore battery and Buona Vista Battery in the 1930s.
- Two single guns each are located at three coastal batteries in Murcia, Spain. They were mounted atop Coastal cliff batteries to protect the Spanish naval base of Cartagena during the Spanish civil war. Two of the guns from the 'La Capa' battery have been removed, but they remain in place at 'Batería de Castillitos' and 'Batería de Cenizas'

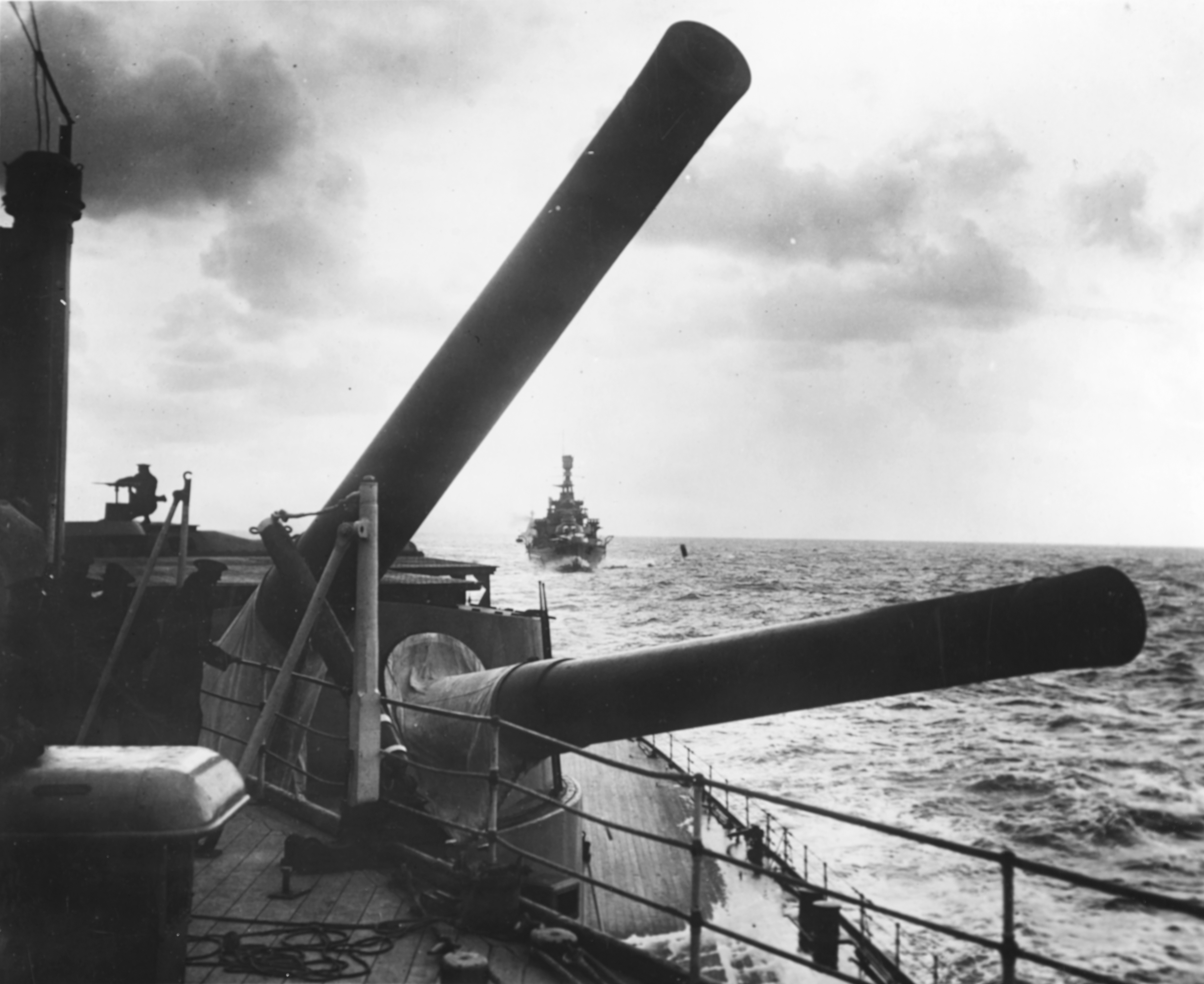
'X' turret (Mk II mount) of HMS Hood, trained forward to port – 1926

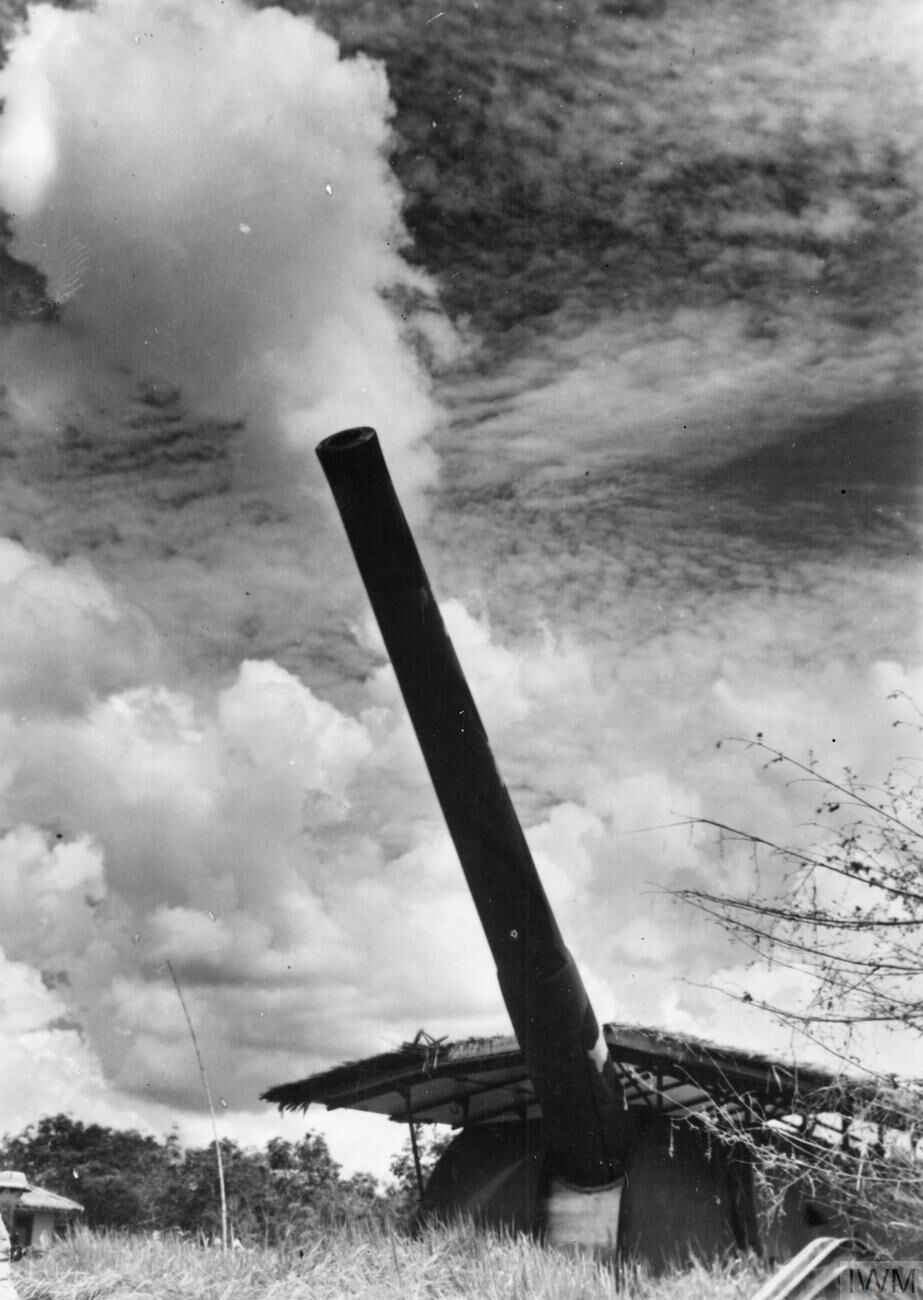
One of Singapore's 15 inch coastal defence guns elevated for firing

== Production ==
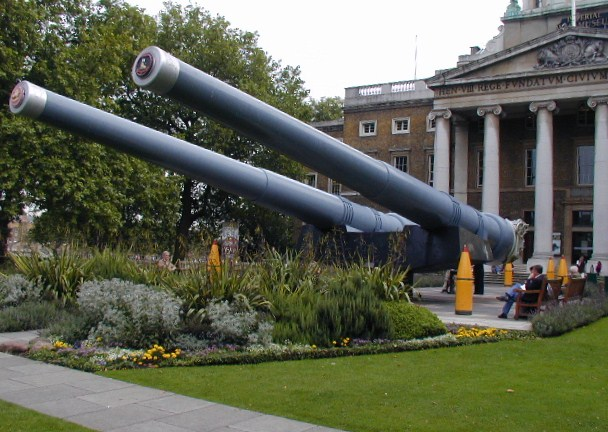
Two 15-inch guns outside the Imperial War Museum; the nearer gun from HMS Ramillies, the other from HMS Roberts.

186 guns were manufactured between 1912 and 1918. They were removed from ships, refurbished, and rotated back into other ships over their lifetime.

- Elswick Ordnance Company, Elswick, Newcastle: 34
- Armstrong Whitworth, Openshaw, Manchester: 12.
- William Beardmore & Company, Parkhead, Glasgow: 37
- Coventry Ordnance Works, Coventry: 19
- Royal Gun Factory, Woolwich: 33
- Vickers, Son and Maxim, Barrow-in-Furness: 49

Two guns, one formerly from HMS Ramillies (left gun) and the other originally mounted in HMS Resolution, but later moved to HMS Roberts (right gun), are mounted outside the Imperial War Museum in London.

== World War II ammunition ==
108 lb Cordite cartridge ¼ charge	AP shell Mk XXII BNT	AP shell and cap, as fired by HMS Malaya into Genoa on 9 February 1941	An AP shell in the process of being hoisted to the gun breech, Singapore 1940

== See also ==
- List of naval guns

=== Weapons of comparable role, performance and era ===
- 38 cm SK L/45 "Max" – German counterpart
- Cannone navale da 381/40 – Italian counterpart
