= Third Battle of Gaza =

1917 World War I battle

- Part of the Middle Eastern theatre of World War I
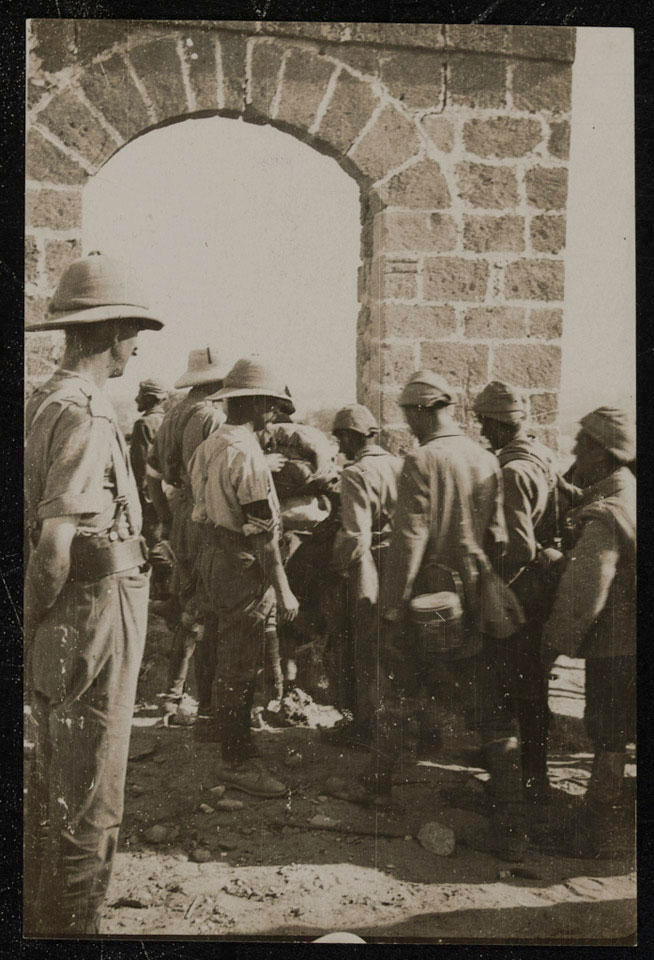
- Ottoman prisoners being brought in after the Third Battle of Gaza
Date	1–2 November 1917 (1 day)
Location	Gaza, southern Palestine 31.4893°N 34.4737°E
Result	Allied victory

Belligerents
Allied Powers: United Kingdom and Empire: Australia; New Zealand; India; France; Italy (Arab Revolt) Hejaz	Central Powers: Ottoman Empire: Germany (military commanders & air force)

Commanders and leaders
(United Kingdom of Great Britain and Ireland) Edmund Allenby (United Kingdom of Great Britain and Ireland) Edward Bulfin	(German Empire) Erich von Falkenhayn (German Empire) Kress von Kressenstein

Units involved
(United Kingdom of Great Britain and Ireland) XXI Corps (United Kingdom of Great Britain and Ireland) Royal Navy	(Ottoman Empire) Eighth Army (Ottoman Empire) Yildirim Army Group (German Empire) Luftstreitkräfte (German Empire) German submarines

Strength
10,000–35,913	4,500–8,000

Casualties and losses
2,696 casualties 1 destroyer sunk 1 monitor sunk: 34 sailors killed	1,000+ buried, 300 captured

The Third Battle of Gaza was fought on the night of 1–2 November 1917 between British and Ottoman forces during the Sinai and Palestine Campaign of World War I and came after the British Egyptian Expeditionary Force (EEF) victory at the Battle of Beersheba had ended the Stalemate in Southern Palestine. The fighting occurred at the beginning of the Southern Palestine Offensive, and, together with attacks on Hareira and Sheria on 6–7 November and the continuing Battle of Tel el Khuweilfe, which had been launched by General Edmund Allenby on 1 November, it eventually broke the Gaza-to-Beersheba line defended by the Yildirim Army Group. Despite having held this line since March 1917, the Ottoman Army was forced to evacuate Gaza and Tel el Khuweilfe during the night of 6–7 November. Only Sheria held out for most of 7 November before it too was captured. (Note: The several battles fought for the Gaza to Beersheba line between 31 October and 7 November were all assigned the title Third Battle of Gaza, although they took place many miles apart and were fought by different corps. [Battles Nomenclature Committee 1922 p. 32, Falls 1930 Vol. 2 Sketch Maps 1–9])

Following British defeats at the First and Second battles of Gaza in March and April 1917, Lieutenant General Philip Chetwode commanding the EEF's Eastern Force and Kress von Kressenstein's Ottoman Empire force had each adopted a defensive posture and a stalemate had developed in Southern Palestine. Entrenched defences approximately on the lines held at the end of the second battle were strengthened, and both sides undertook regular mounted reconnaissances into the open eastern flank. In late June, Allenby replaced General Archibald Murray as commander of the EEF, which he quickly reorganised. At about the same time, the Ottoman Fourth Army was also restructured. As the stalemate continued in terrible conditions through the summer, reinforcements began to arrive to replace the large number of casualties suffered by the EEF during the previous fighting for Gaza, while several additional divisions also arrived. The Ottoman defenders were also reinforced at this time, and both sides carried out training while manning the front lines and monitoring the open eastern flank. By mid-October, as the Battle of Passchendaele continued on the Western Front, the last of the British reinforcements arrived as Allenby's preparations to commence a campaign of manoeuvre neared completion.

Prior to the Second Battle of Gaza, the town had been developed into a strong modern fortress, with entrenchments, wire entanglements and a glacis on its south and south–eastern edges. A series of field works, mutually supported by artillery, machine guns and rifles, extended from Gaza eastwards to within 4 miles (6.4 km) of Beersheba. Beginning on 27 October, the EEF began a heavy and almost continuous bombardment of Gaza. During this time, the EEF's XXI Corps, holding the Gaza section of the line, had been mostly passive until the night of 1/2 November, when a series of determined night-time assaults were mounted against the Gaza defences. Yet these attacks were only partially successful due to the strength of the garrison. The bombardment of Gaza intensified on 6 November and during the night of 6/7 November successful attacks were launched on several trench systems. On the morning of 7 November, Gaza was found to have been evacuated during the night. The Gaza to Beersheba line subsequently collapsed and the Ottoman Seventh and Eighth Armies were forced into retreat. Following several battles during the pursuit, the EEF captured Jerusalem on 9 December 1917.

== Background ==
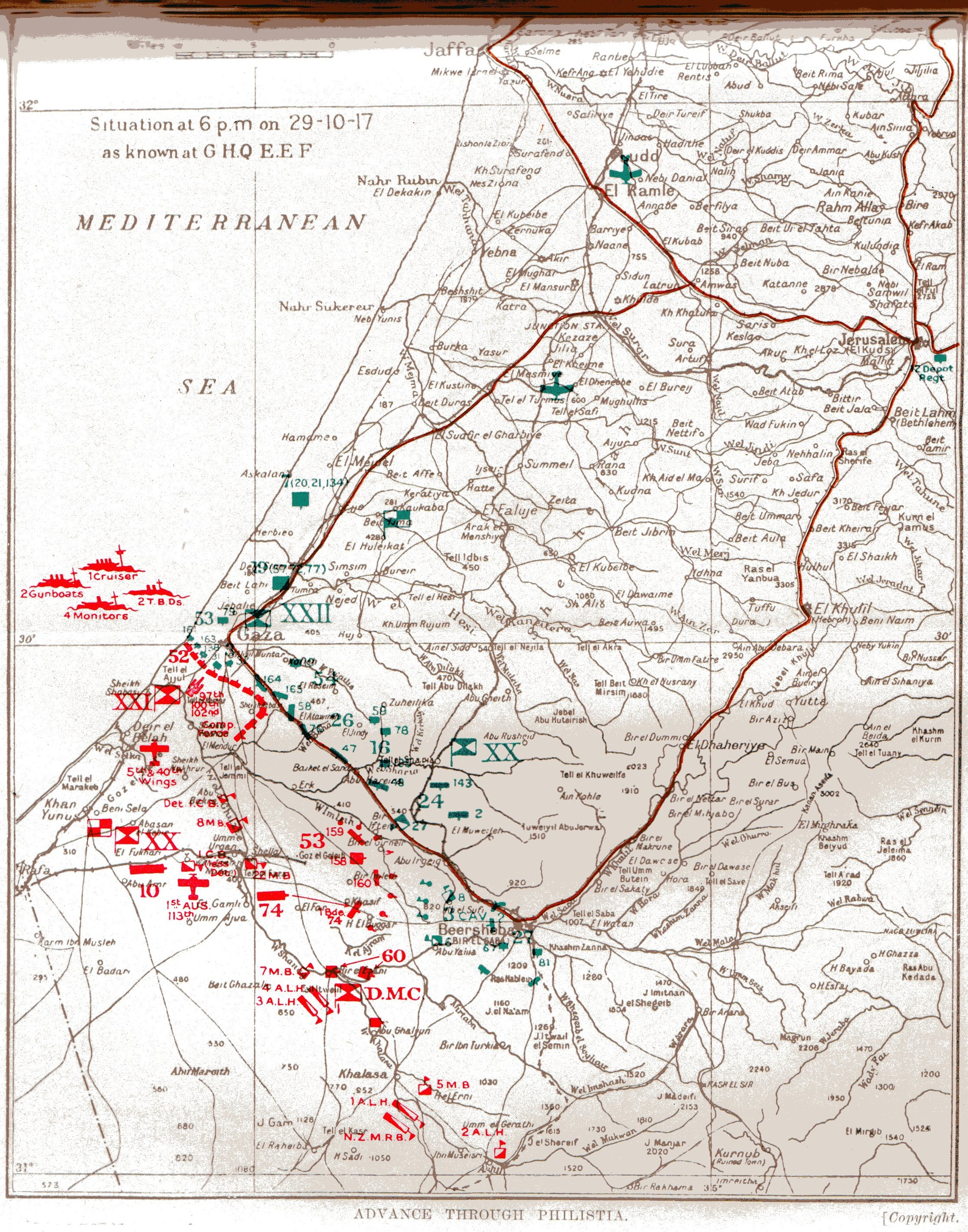
Situation at 18:00 29 October 1917 as known at GHQ EEF

Gaza was "a strong modern fortress, well entrenched and wired, with good observation and a glacis on its southern and south–eastern face." These defences which were too strong for a daytime attack were extended eastwards by a series of "field works" to four miles (6.4 km) from Beersheba. These fortifications were between 1,500 to 2,000 yards (1,400 to 1,800 m) apart, each mutually supported by fire from artillery, machine guns and rifles.

As the troops of the Egyptian Expeditionary Force (EEF) began to concentrate in preparation for their attacks, they left their camps standing to deceive German and Ottoman aerial reconnaissances. The EEF assumed their opponents thought there were still six infantry divisions in the Gaza area and one in the eastern sector towards Beersheba. However, according to Cyril Falls, "[t]here is evidence that the [Yildirim Army Group] were fairly accurately informed of the British dispositions." On 28 October, they knew the camps at Khan Yunis and Rafa were empty and accurately placed three infantry divisions east of the Wadi Ghuzzee with a fourth, the 10th (Irish) Division approaching the wadi. They estimated more cavalry at Asluj and Khalasa than was actually there.

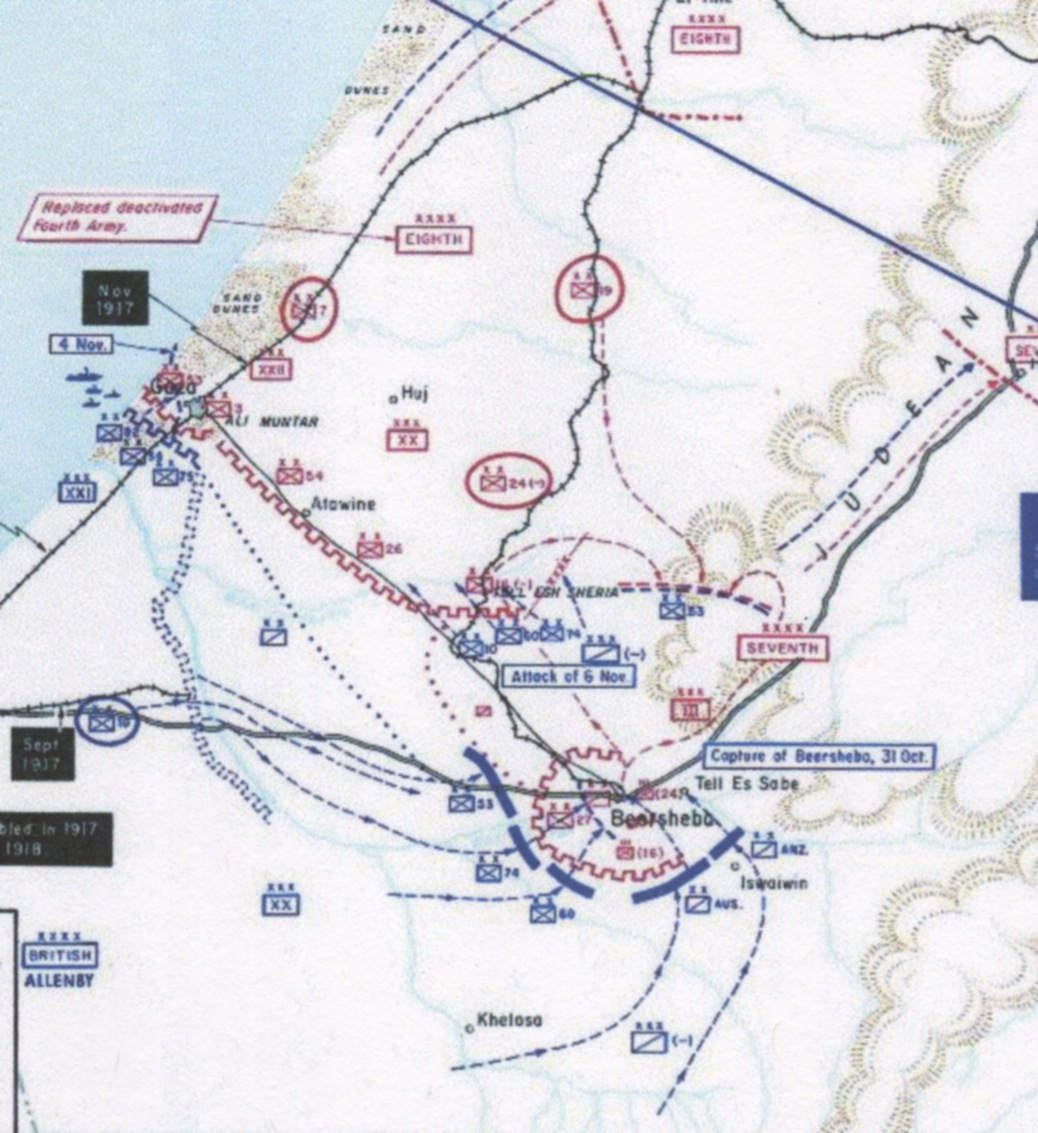
Positions on the Gaza-Beersheba line after the capture of Beersheba

The loss of Beersheba on 31 October stunned the Yildirim Army Group commander and staff. The Beersheba garrison withdrew either to the Ottoman defences around Tel es Sheria or northwards to Tel el Khuweilfe to defend the Hebron road. Here a considerable force, including all available reserve units, was deployed in the Kuweilfeh area to stop a threatened advance up the Hebron road to Jerusalem about fifty miles (80 km) to the north. According to C. Guy Powles " ... the Turkish line had been thrown back on its left, but not broken." The remainder of the Ottoman line stretching westward to the Mediterranean coast continued to be strongly defended, particularly at Hareira, Sharia and Gaza, but the loss of Beersheba had placed EEF mounted units across the Beersheba to Hebron and Jerusalem road, and three Eighth Army infantry battalions were sent by the German General Friedrich Freiherr Kress von Kressenstein to reinforce the Ottoman troops fighting at Khuweilfe to protect the road. They established a new defensive line north of Beersheba, and the 19th Division was sent from the XXII Corps defending Gaza to reinforce the new line at Ebuhof. However, the objective of the EEF advance north of Beersheba was to separate the Ottoman forces supplied by the roads and railways from Ramleh on the maritime plain from those supplied by the motor road from Jerusalem north of Beersheba. Such an advance would also place the EEF infantry corps in a position to begin to "roll up" the Ottoman flank.

== Prelude ==
Situation at 18:00 1 November 1917

The EEF controlled the coastal sea lanes, and the Intelligence Service spread rumours about possible sea landings in the rear of Gaza. Ships were seen taking soundings off the coast and a fleet of small boats was located near Deir el Belah. During the late afternoon of 1 November, an embarkation of members of the Egyptian Labour Corps onto motor launches, trawlers and tugs at Deir el Belah was staged as a feint, giving the appearance of continuing into the night. The next morning, two trawlers appeared off the mouth of the Wadi el Hesi north of Gaza. To add to the confusion, between the Battle of Beersheba on 31 October and the main attacks at the Battle of Hareira and Sheria beginning on 6 November, the Ottoman left flank north of Beersheba was being fiercely contested during the Battle of Tel el Khuweilfe for control of the road to Hebron and Jerusalem. According to Wavell, "an assault on a portion of the Gaza defences was to be made by the XXI Corps." The date of this attack, which was primarily a feint, was scheduled for between 24 and 48 hours before the attack on Sheria.

Meanwhile, preparations for the main attacks on the Gaza line at Hareira and Sharia, began on 1 November when the 53rd (Welsh) Division, with the Imperial Camel Brigade on the right, advanced northwards to occupy a line 3 miles (4.8 km) to the west without opposition. This placed the infantry in a position from which they could cover the right flank of the proposed attack by the XX Corps on Hareira and Sheria.

=== Defenders ===
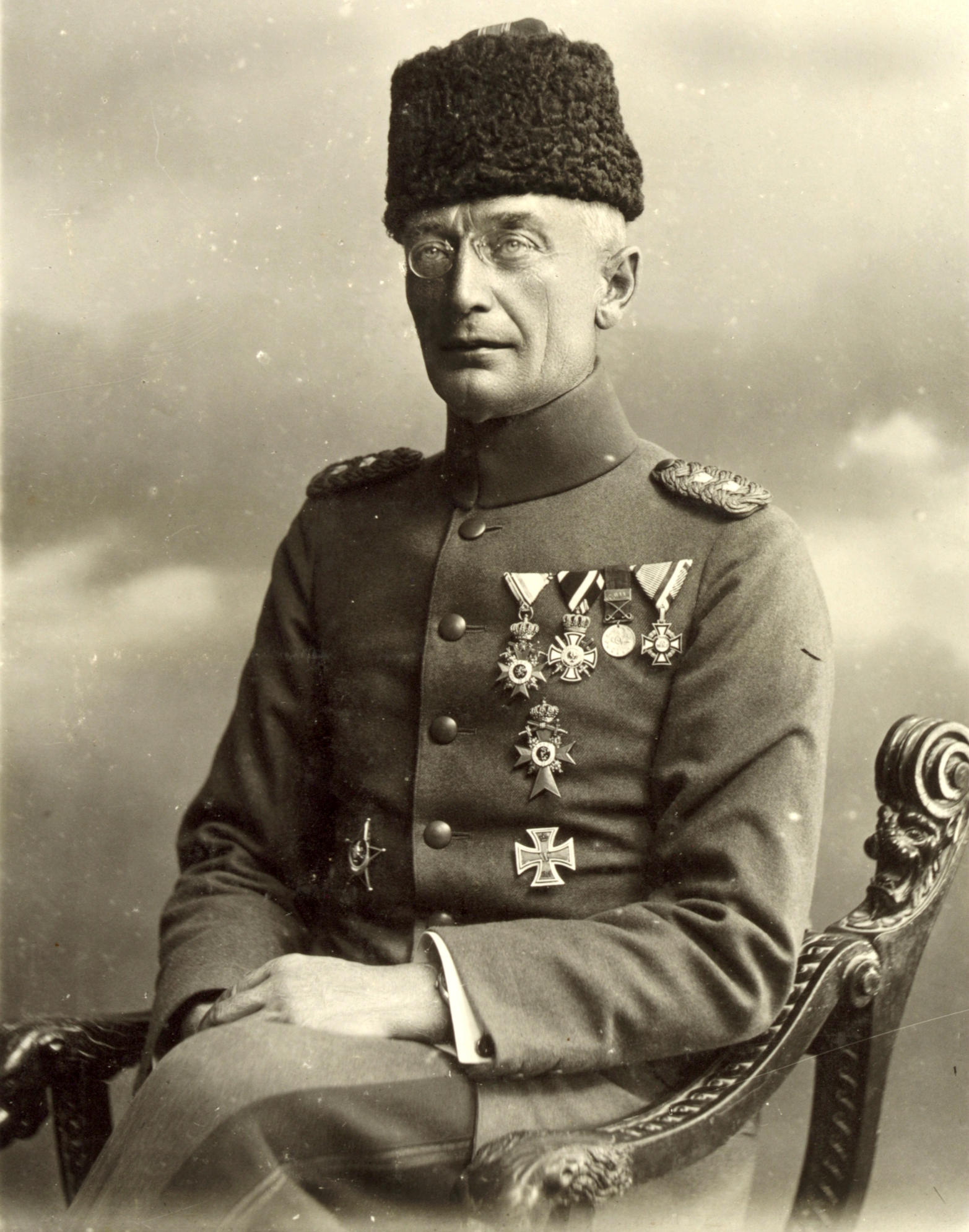
Commander of the Ottoman Eighth Army, General Kress von Kressenstein

After the second battle for Gaza in April 1917, Kress von Kressenstein — commander of the victorious 3rd, 16th and 53rd Divisions—was reinforced by the 7th and 54th Divisions. The 7th Infantry Division (later part of the Eighth Army) had experienced four months of strategic movement, similar to that of the 54th Division. Having arrived at Jerusalem, in early May the 20th Infantry Regiment began company-level training. After moving to Beersheba where they remained in reserve, they participated in theatre-specific training until late June, when they went into the front line. Training in fortification, reconnaissance, and counter–reconnaissance continued. The 21st Infantry Regiment received similar training, and on 6 August the regimental colours of the 20th and 21st Infantry Regiments were awarded military medals for service in the Gallipoli Campaign. At Beersheba on 28 June, the 7th Infantry Division inactivated the fourth company of each infantry battalion, before activating a machine gun company armed with light machine guns, in every infantry battalion on 10 August. Every Ottoman infantry division in Palestine repeated this reorganisation, with one quarter of their rifle strength being replaced by light machine guns, considerably increasing their fire power and strengthening their offensive and defensive capabilities. Following orders from von Kressenstein commanding the Gaza to Beersheba line defences, assault detachments equivalent to the German Stosstruppen (Stormtroopers) were formed. The 7th Division activated an assault detachment of fifty men on 17 July 1917.

The Yildirim Army Group under the command of Field Marshal Erich von Falkenhayn was responsible for the defence of Palestine. On the western flank the Ottoman Eighth Army was composed of the XXII Corps' 3rd and 53rd Divisions defending Gaza and the XX Corps' 26th and 54th Divisions defending the line stretching to the east of Gaza, under the command of von Kressenstein. The defence of Gaza was the responsibility of XXII Corps, which had two divisions in the front line (53rd, 3rd from west to east) and two in reserve (7th and 19th). The XXII Corps' four regiments had 4,500 rifles, which were reinforced by two divisions to bring the total to 8,000 defenders, deployed thus:

- 53rd Division holding from the Mediterranean shore to the eastern side of Gaza (veteran of the Second Battle of Gaza),
- 3rd Division on their left (veteran of the First and Second Battles of Gaza), and the
- 7th Division in reserve close behind.

These three divisions were supported by the 116 guns of the Ottoman XXII Corps artillery, six large naval guns and several batteries of 150 mm howitzers. (Note: As already indicated, the XXII Corps' second reserve division, the 19th Division, was sent to reinforce the new line north of Beersheba. [Erickson 2001, p. 172])

On the left of the XX Corps the Ottoman Seventh Army defended Beersheba, under the command of Fevzi Pasa. (Note: Although Erickson states "Mustafa Kemal Pasa held the line ... " [Erickson 2001, p. 172] he describes Kemal writing a letter on 20 or 30 September which led to his resignation several weeks later. [Erickson 2001, p. 171])

=== Attackers ===
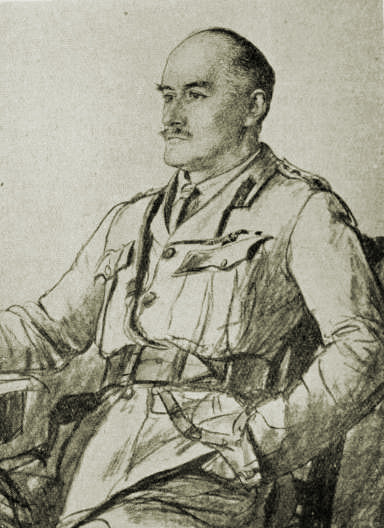
Commander of the Egyptian Expeditionary Force, General Allenby c. 1917

The EEF comprised 200,000 men including Arab workers, 46,000 horses, 20,000 camels, more than 15,000 mules and donkeys, and hundreds of artillery pieces. The fighting strength of the EEF was 100,189:

- Desert Mounted Corps commanded by Lieutenant General Harry Chauvel had 745 officers, 17,935 other ranks in the Anzac, Australian and Yeomanry Mounted Divisions;
- XX Corps commanded by Lieutenant General Philip Chetwode had 1,435 officers, 44,171 other ranks in the 10th, 53rd, 60th and 74th (Yeomanry) Divisions; and
- XXI Corps commanded by Lieutenant General Edward Bulfin had 1,154 officers and 34,759 other ranks in three infantry divisions. By 30 October there were 35,000 rifles in the XXI Corps deployed to attack Gaza. They were:

- 52nd (Lowland) Division (veteran of the First and Second Battles of Gaza)
- 54th (East Anglian) Division (veteran of the First and Second Battles of Gaza)
- 75th Division
- Composite Force of almost a division, consisting of the 25th Indian Infantry Brigade, a West Indian battalion, the French Détachement français de Palestine and the Italian Distaccamento italiano di Palestina, was camped east of the 75th Division.
- Imperial Service Cavalry Brigade 1,000 sabres
- XXI Corps Cavalry Regiment, also known as the Composite Regiment, consisted of one squadron each from the Royal Glasgow Yeomanry, the Duke of Lancaster Yeomanry, and the 1/1st Hertfordshire Yeomanry.

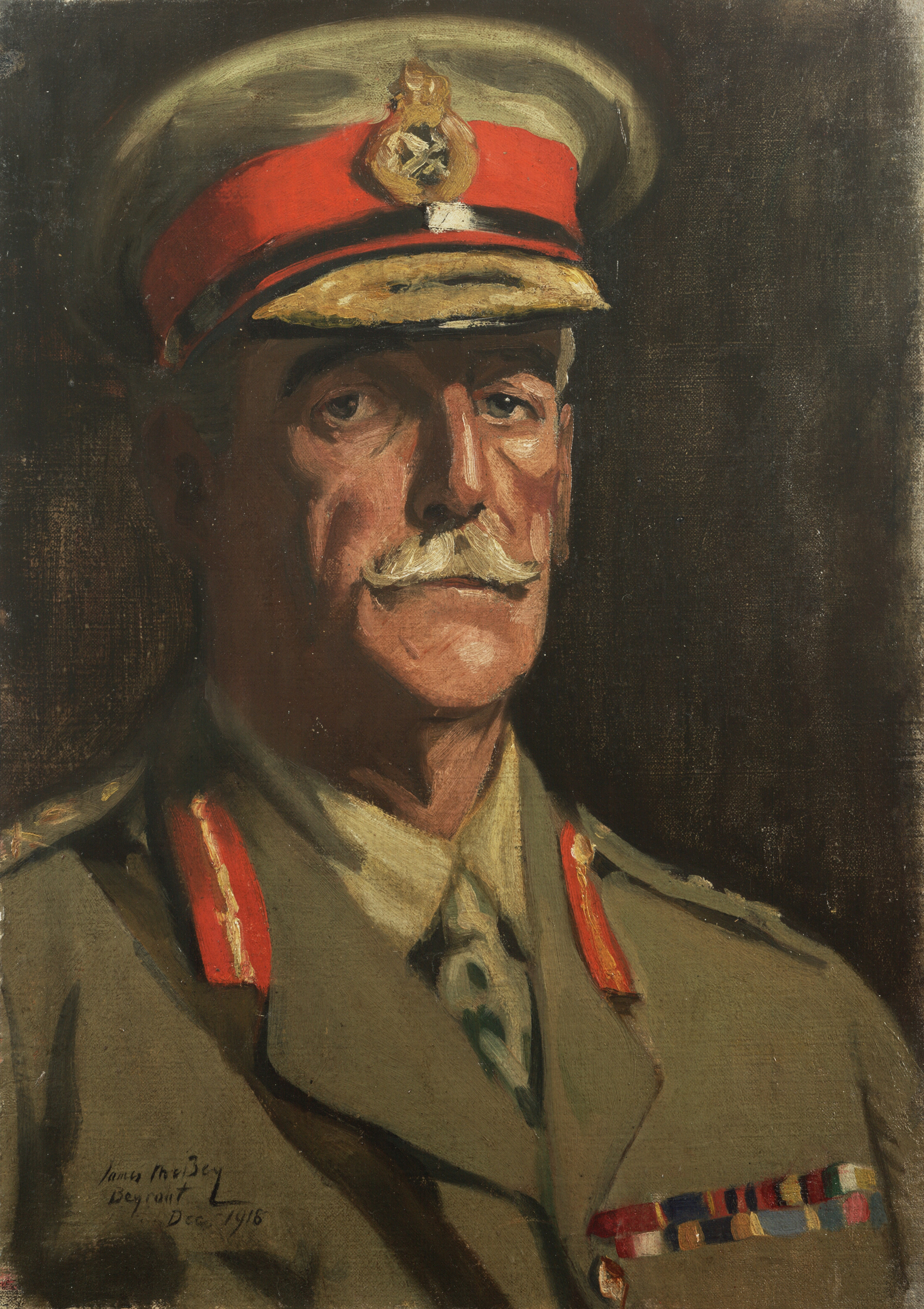
Lieutenant General Bulfin, commander of XXI Corps

The majority of General Edmund Allenby's infantry were Territorial divisions, mobilised at the outbreak of the war. Most had fought the Ottoman Army before. During the Gallipoli Campaign, the 52nd (Lowland) Division fought at Cape Helles, the 53rd (Welsh) Division and the 54th (East Anglian) Division fought at Suvla Bay, while the 60th (London) Division had served on the Western Front and on the Salonika front. The recently formed 74th (Yeomanry) Division was raised from eighteen under-strength yeomanry regiments, all of which had fought dismounted at Gallipoli. The 10th (Irish) Division was a New Army (K1) division, and had also fought at Suvla Bay and at Salonika. All three of the brigades of the Anzac Mounted Division and the two light horse brigades of the Australian Mounted Division had also fought at Gallipoli. (Note: Erickson overlooks the 52nd (Lowland) Division and the Anzac Mounted Division fighting the Ottoman Empire at Romani in the Sinai Peninsula. He also overlooks the Anzac Mounted Division fighting the Ottoman Empire at Magdhaba and Rafa. He also failed to acknowledge those who had fought the Ottoman Empire in the first and second Gaza battles.[Erickson 2007, p. 111–112])

Army Wing aircraft were assigned to carry out strategic reconnaissances, to report on Ottoman reserves well behind their lines, to carry out daily photography, and to conduct air raids. Fighter and bombing squadrons were established for these purposes while the Corps Squadrons were attached to the two infantry corps carried out artillery and contact patrols, along with tactical reconnaissance.

==== Sherifial Forces ====
In July, Allenby was hopeful that T. E. Lawrence and the Sherifial Arab force could support a September attack by the EEF, recognising that harvests were being collected before that time, and that after the end of September they normally moved to camel-grazing lands in the Syrian desert. He wrote, "They, naturally, won't and can't do much unless I move; and it is not much use their destroying the Turks' communications unless I take immediate advantage of such destruction ... If I bring them into the fight and do not make progress myself, this will also expose them to retaliation—which to some tribes, such as the Druzes, S. of Damascus, may mean annihilation." The EEF encouraged the Bedouin to defect:

The Arab rebellion is spreading well, and the Turkish communications will be difficult to guard against their raids. The enclosed photograph of the Shereef of Mecca, and the proclamation by him, is one of the means we have of inducing the Arabs to desert the Turks. We drop these papers and packets of cigarettes over the Turkish lines from aeroplanes. The proclamation is an appeal from the Shereef to the Arabs to leave the Turks and join in the war against them for the freedom and independence of Arabia. A good many come in, as a result of our propaganda.

— Allenby letter to his wife 3 October 1917

== Battle ==
Four EEF infantry brigades of 10,000 rifles attacked four Ottoman regiments of 4,500 rifles—which were reinforced by two divisions to over 8,000. Both sides suffered heavy losses. The attacks were to be carried out by well-prepared troops, with overwhelming artillery support and six Mark IV tanks. These attacks were designed to keep the Gaza garrison of 8,000 riflemen supported by 116 guns in place after the capture of Beersheba and during preparations for the main EEF attacks on Hareira and Sheria.

=== Preliminary raids on Outpost Hill ===
Gaza defences south of the town including Outpost Hill

On 26 October, units of the 75th Division raided Outpost Hill. Then, just hours after the capture of Beersheba, on 1 November, a second raid by five officers and 220 riflemen of the 3/3rd Gurkhas Rifles (233rd Brigade 75th Division) was carried out against Outpost Hill. At 03:00, under cover of an intense bombardment, they entered the Turkish defences on the hill; two Gurkhas were killed and twenty-three wounded. During the fighting, they killed twenty-eight Ottoman soldiers and captured sixteen, before returning to their lines. The division was to make another attack during the next night, (1/2 November) towards Atawineh Redoubt, on the Gaza to Beersheba road.

=== Bombardment ===
On 27 October, the XXI Corps artillery began the bombardment of Gaza, which gradually grew more intense with the support of British and French Navy's guns from 29 October. They included the fourteen inches (360 mm) guns on HMS Raglan, the Monitors M15 9.2 inches (230 mm) guns, the M29, the M31, and the M32 with 6 inches (150 mm) guns, the cruiser Grafton, and the destroyers Staunch and Comet. French vessels included the Requin, Arbalète, Voltigeur, Coutelas, Fauconneau and Hache. There were also two river gunboats Ladybird and Aphis, and three seaplane bombers. This flotilla was in action—although not altogether to allow for return to Port Said for refuelling—until the attack on Gaza was launched. The flotilla was targeted by hostile aircraft, while a shell from an Ottoman shore battery hit the mess deck of the Requin, causing 38 casualties.

The land based artillery of Bulfin's XXI Corps' heavy artillery consisted of 68 medium and heavy guns and howitzers, which were directed on to the Ottoman batteries during the battle. In addition two 6-inch guns made a surprise attack on the Ottoman railhead at Beit Hanun at a range of nine miles (14 km), supported by balloon observation. Between 27 October and the attack on Gaza, 15,000 rounds were fired by the heavy artillery; three hundred rounds were allocated for the destruction of each Ottoman battery which had been located. The anti–battery bombardments between 29 and 31 October also fired gas shells, which apparently had little or no effect. Together with the corps' three divisional artilleries, the guns produced the heaviest bombardment of World War I outside European theatres. (Note: Colonel Hussein Husni mentions gas being used on 31 October, but that, "the yellow smoke emitted by certain shells on explosion was mistaken for gas," [Husni quoted in Falls 1930 Vol. 2 p. 77] but that no defensive arrangements had been made at Gaza against the possibility of gas attacks, although gas had been fired at the woodland area south west of Ali Muntar, during the Second Battle of Gaza. [Falls 1930 Vol. 1 pp. 335–7, Vol. 2 p. 77]) The sixth night's bombardment from onshore and offshore guns produced "an even heavier concentration of fire on a small area than had been put in on the first day of the Battle of the Somme." The six-day bombardment program was arranged "so that the whole of the front of our group is plastered all day and every day."

=== 1/2 November night attacks ===
Western side deployments on 1 and 2 November at Gaza

The XXI Corps attacks were focused on a five-thousand-yard (4,600 m) stretch of sandhills stretching from Umbrella Hill about two thousand yards (1,800 m) south-west of Gaza to the Mediterranean Sea. (Note: The Ottoman trenches on Umbrella Hill, to the west of the Rafa to Gaza road, had a flat-topped tree nearby which was to become well known during the Third Battle of Gaza. These trenches had been bombed on 18 May. [Falls 1930 Vol. 1 p. 364]) They were timed for the night because the strength of the Ottoman machine guns in defensive positions made day-time attacks impossible. On the right flank, the final objective of the attack was only 500 yards (460 m) behind the Ottoman front line, but on the left it was 2,500 yards (2,300 m) away.

The first phase was the attack at Umbrella Hill by the 1/7th Battalion Scottish Rifles with one company of 1/8th Battalion, Scottish Rifles (156th Brigade, 52nd Division). The second phase was the capture on a broad front of El Arish Redoubt to the Sea Post on the shore by the 1/4th Battalion, Royal Scots and one company of 1/8th Battalion, Scottish Rifles (156th Brigade). The third phase was to be conducted by the 161st Brigade (less one battalion) and the 163rd Brigade (54th Division) against Gaza's south-western defences, while the fourth phase by the 162nd Brigade was to capture Gun Hill and Sheikh Hasan 3,500 yards (3,200 m) behind the front line at Sheikh Ajlin. On 1 and 2 November, the Ottoman 7th and 53rd Divisions continued to defend most of their front line, carrying out locally successful counterattacks.

==== Phase one: Umbrella Hill ====
Umbrella Hill and El Arish redoubt

On 1 November, the assault of Umbrella Hill—a sand dune two thousand yards (1,800 m) south–west of Gaza to the west of the Rafa to Gaza road overlooking the main objectives—was to begin at 23:00. The defending garrison was "assumed to be about 350 strong". However, at 10:50 a preliminary move into No Man's Land was observed by Ottoman soldiers in Fisher's Orchard, who gave the alarm and began firing machine guns and rifles from the Ottoman trenches on Umbrella Hill. At 23:00, an intense EEF bombardment began enabling a tape to be laid, along which the attacking troops formed up to launch their attack ten minutes later. Under cover of the intense ten-minute bombardment, the 1/7th Battalion, Scottish Rifles with one company of 1/8th Battalion, Scottish Rifles (156th Brigade, 52nd (Lowland) Division) attacked Umbrella Hill. After killing many of the defenders, they quickly captured the hill, three officers, fifty-five Ottoman soldiers, three Lewis guns and numerous bombs. The attackers suffered light casualties; however the sand dune was difficult to defend because the Ottoman trenches—without revetments—had virtually disappeared during the previous bombardments. The following Ottoman bombardment of Umbrella Hill caused 103 casualties to the 1/7th Battalion Scottish Rifles during the next twenty-four hours. However, with the hill captured by the 52nd (Lowland) Division, the main attack could begin.

==== Phase two: El Arish redoubt ====
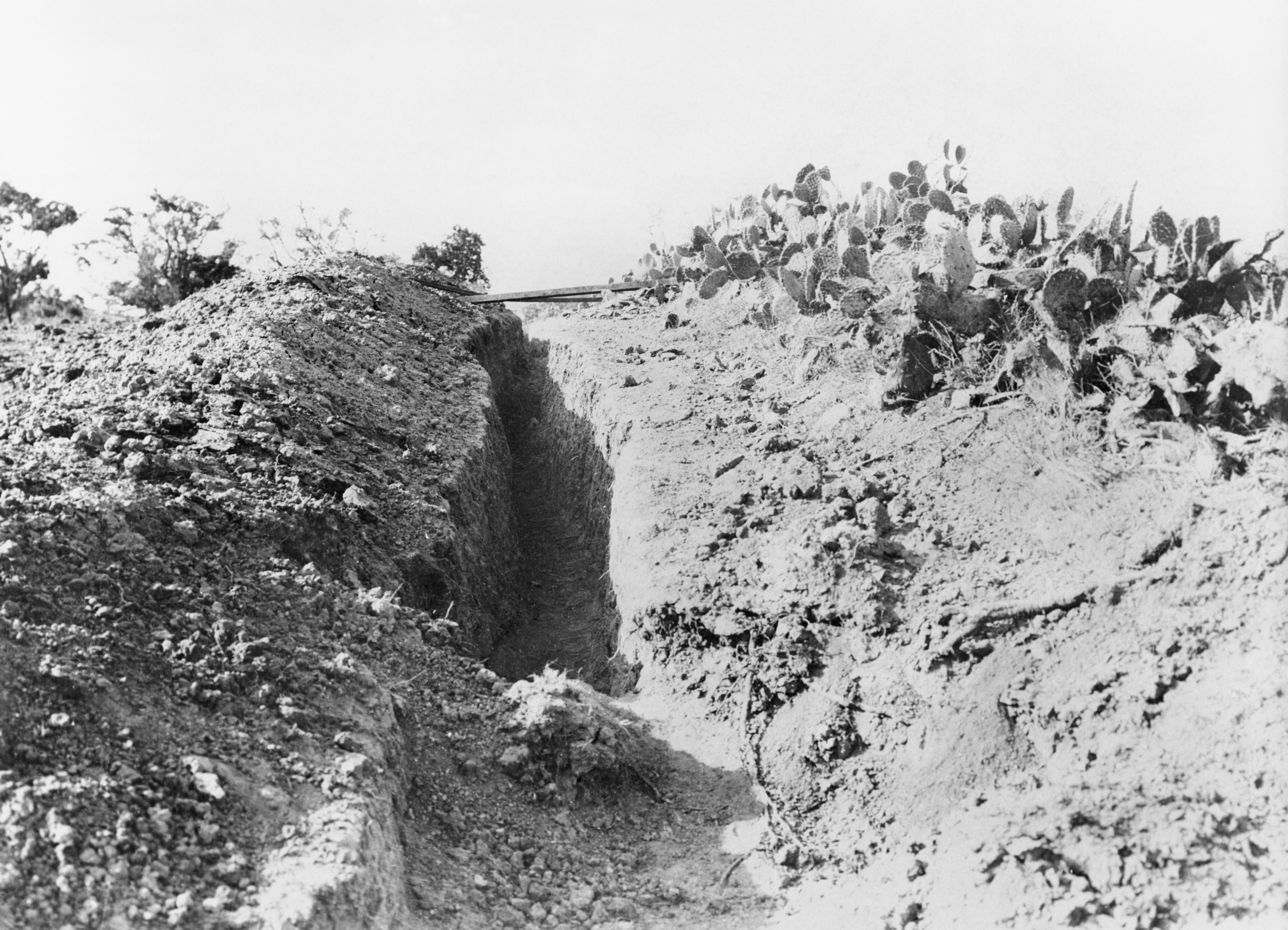
Ottoman trenches in el Arish Redoubt captured on 2 November by the 4th Battalion Royal Scots, supported by two companies of the 8th Battalion Scottish Rifles, 52nd (Lowland) Division

The second phase began at 03:00 on 2 November when the 156th Brigade of the 52nd (Lowland) Division launched the first attack on the El Arish Redoubt. This attack was aimed at breaking the line of defensive fortifications consisting of three groups of trench complexes and redoubts. These were the El Arish, Rafa, and Cricket redoubts, which were connected by a "series of trench lines several layers thick, and backed by other trenches and strong points" stretching two miles (3.2 km) along the seaward defences to the west of Umbrella Hill. The attack on El Arish redoubt was to be supported by two of the six available tanks of the Palestine Tank Detachment's eight tanks. (Note: All but three tanks had been obsolete Mark I machines, which observers considered had "prematurely alarmed" the defenders, at the beginning of the attacks. [Falls 1930 Vol. 2 p. 72])

The 1/4th Battalion, Royal Scots (156th Brigade) assault on El Arish Redoubt was carried out in waves through the Ottoman trenches, during which six Ottoman mines exploded, causing EEF casualties. The Ottoman artillery, which had become active as a result of the first attack, had stopped shortly before the second attack began at 06:00 with an intense, ten-minute bombardment. At 06:30, a heavy Ottoman counterattack drove back the leading company of Royal Scots, causing a number of casualties. A platoon from another company helped rally the remnants of the leading company, which was reinforced by the 1/4th Battalion Royal Scots and 1/8th Battalion Scottish Rifles when the position was consolidated. Two tanks passed through El Arish Redoubt, but shortly afterwards one was abandoned and the other hit, while a third tank moved along the front line rolling out wire from Sea Post on the coast to Beach Post.

A man who obviously had been able to get more than his allowance [of rum] started singing loudly, and was removed. We then set off in a long line, and passed through our front line trenches into "No–Man's–Land." I saw a man breaking the ranks, and dodging back towards our lines, obviously his nerves having given way. An NCO dashed out, got hold of him, and took him away. I was with Hq. sigs. [headquarters signals] in the "fourth wave." Four parallel lines of white tape, had been laid out, and I and the others spaced ourselves out along the fourth tape, and lay down, facing the enemy lines, to await the signal to advance. Two tanks came rumbling up from behind, and a few of us had to jump up and get out of the way to let them pass ... Our shelling increased in volume, and at 03:00 the 4th RS [Royal Scots] advanced in four lines on a front of 300 yards (270 m) towards the El Arish Redoubt. Two Turkish contact mines exploded as our "first wave" approached the redoubt, blowing many of the men to pieces. We were not, of course, aware of this at the time. As I got near the Turkish trenches the enemy shell and machine–gun fire became so intense, with shells bursting all around, that I and several others decided to stop in a large shell or mine crater for a few minutes till the shelling eased somewhat. When the barrage moved forward we resumed our advance.

— Lance Corporal R. Loudon, Signaller, 1/4th Royal Scots, 156th Brigade, 52nd (Lowland) Division

==== Phase three: coastal defences ====
El Arish Redoubt, Burj Trench, Gibraltar, Crested Rock, Zowaiid Trench, Beach Post, Cricket Redoubt and Sea Post

When the Royal Scots had entered the eastern section of the El Arish Redoubt during the second phase of the attack, the western half was still held by Ottoman defenders. These defences became the objectives of the attacks by the 161st and 163rd Brigades of the 54th (East Anglian) Division, supported by four tanks—including the two which had passed through the El Arish redoubt. On the right of the 163rd Brigade's advance, the 1/5th Battalion, The Suffolk Regiment moved towards the Ottoman trenches following a creeping barrage to attack and over–run the western El Arish trenches during hand–to–hand fighting when the 1/5th Battalion, The Suffolk Regiment suffered light casualties. Although they had captured the third line, part of this captured territory had to be abandoned because it was exposed to hostile fire, so they consolidated their position along the second line. Half of the 1/8th Battalion, Hampshire Regiment attacked Burj Trench while the other half attacked Triangle Trench, although it was not their objective. This caused some confusion, and the 1/4th and 1/5th Battalions, The Norfolk Regiment lost direction in the dust and smoke of the cloudy, hazy night. As a result, only small numbers reached Gibraltar and Crested Rock, from where they were quickly forced to withdraw.

On the left, the attacks by the 161st Brigade were similarly weakened by loss of direction when the 1/5th Battalion, The Essex Regiment attacked Rafa Redoubt instead of Zowaiid trench. However, the 1/6th Battalion, The Essex Regiment attacked and captured Beach and Sea Posts before attacking the Rafa Redoubt and trench systems, suffering light casualties. In support, a tank rolled out wire as it drove along the front line from Sea Post to Beach Post. Cricket Redoubt was captured with the help of the tank from Beach Post; although the tank was temporarily disabled in the process. After being repaired, the tank was transporting some engineers' stores to Sheikh Hasan when it was hit and disabled again. Two reserve tanks were ordered forward carrying engineers' stores—including sandbags which were set on fire by hostile fire.

On the morning of the 2nd, Bulfin put in an attack, by the 54th and part of the 52nd Division, on the S.W. of Gaza. He got all his objectives, with the exception of a few yards of trench here and there ... The navy have given us great help. They are making splendid practice on the Gaza defences, and the railway bridge and junction at Deir Sineid. This is the result of careful preliminary work and close collaboration between land and sea.

— Allenby letter to Robertson 3 November 1917

==== Phase four: 2 November ====
On their right, the 1/10th Battalion, London Regiment (161st Brigade) finished capturing and consolidating the Rafa redoubt, which had only been partly captured by the 1/6th Battalion, The Essex Regiment. Without the assistance of tanks which had been put out of action, this battalion lost contact with the barrage and suffered heavy losses. Nevertheless, they captured Gun Hill and by 06:00 on 2 November they were preparing to attack Sheikh Hasan, which they captured fifteen minutes later along with 182 prisoners.

Lion Trench, 0.75 miles (1.21 km) north-east of Sheikh Hasan, was attacked at 07:30 by the 1/4th Battalion, Northamptonshire Regiment (162nd Brigade) with the objective of clearing a gap through which the Imperial Service Cavalry Brigade could advance. However, 20 minutes after their successful attack, the Northamptonshire without artillery support were almost surrounded and forced to retreat to Sheikh Hasan on the coast. Here a strong counterattack was threatened by two regiments of reinforcements from the Ottoman 7th Division, which were advancing from Deir Sneid to the north and north-east. (See Falls Map 6 Coastal sector) These Ottoman reinforcements were stopped by accurate shelling by the Corps Heavy Artillery, which fired on a three thousand yards (2,700 m) line previously registered and by shelling from the monitors off the coast. A planned repeat of the Lion Trench attack was postponed when the 1/4th Battalion, Northamptonshire Regiment attacked Yunis Trench instead. Although they captured the trench they were driven back by a counterattack. Throughout the remainder of the day, Ottoman heavy batteries shelled Sheikh Hasan, before the batteries were withdrawn during the night to the north-east of Gaza. During the night of 2/3 November, Ottoman troops strengthened their defences on Turtle Hill, facing Sheikh Hasan.

The Third Battle of Gaza was never intended to capture the town, but to keep the garrison in place after the capture of Beersheba. Only the first line of Ottoman trenches had been the objectives of the XXI Corps, which used new infantry tactics, tanks and massed artillery organised in accordance with Western Front standards. Although all objectives had not been won, the operations had forced two regiments of the Ottoman 7th Division reserve to move away from Hareira and Sheria, forward to strengthen the Ottoman defences between Gaza and the sea. According to the British official historian, "The attack on the western defences of Gaza ... had fulfilled the Commander-in-Chief's object." The EEF had also inflicted severe losses on the Ottoman defenders; more than one thousand of whom the EEF buried in the captured trenches. The EEF captured twenty-eight officers, 418 soldiers, twenty-nine machine guns and seven trench mortars. During the fighting, the corps infantry had advanced about two miles (3.2 km) on a five thousand yards (4.6 km) front, and held their gains against repeated Ottoman counterattacks, although the attempt to create a gap for the Imperial Service Cavalry Brigade to ride through was not successful. The front line defensive system on the south–west side of Gaza had been captured and the infantry occupied a position from which they could threaten "Ali Muntar and the rest of the defences in front of the town." The XXI Corps suffered 350 killed, 350 missing and two thousand wounded during this fighting. Many casualties were blamed on loss of direction and crowding in the captured trenches, which were too shallow.

This morning, at 3 o'clock, I attacked the SW front of the Gaza defences. We took them; on a front of some 6000 yards, and to a depth of some 1000 to 1500 yards. We now overlook Gaza; and my left is on the sea coast, NE of the town. The Navy cooperated with fire from the sea; and shot well. We've taken some 300 prisoners and some machine guns, so far.

— Allenby letter to his wife written on 1 and 2 November 1917

=== Air raids ===
Air raids by the EEF were carried out during the night of 1/2 November, with twelve bombs being dropped on Gaza, and on 3 and 4 November, with air raids over the hills north of Beersheba.

== Aftermath ==
=== 3–6 November ===
During a Khamsin on 3 November while the bombardment of Gaza resumed, the 1/4th Battalion The Essex Regiment (161st Brigade, 54th Division, XXI Corps) attacked and captured Yunis trench at 04:30. However, they were heavily counterattacked and forced to withdraw. The following night, several strong Ottoman counterattacks were made on the 75th Division's position at Sheikh Abbas on the eastern side of Gaza, which were all stopped by machine gun and rifle fire. Meanwhile, the newly won position at Sheikh Hasan on the Ottoman right flank was consolidated.

By 5 November 1917, the Ottoman XXII Corps commander in charge of the defence of Gaza, Colonel Refet Bele, was continuing to maintain the "integrity of the Gaza fortress", despite the Gaza garrison's artillery batteries having only about 300 shells left. These batteries had also been suffering from effective counter-battery fire from the EEF Heavy Artillery Groups. Refet had been warned the day before that evacuation may be necessary because of the loss of Beersheba, so plans were prepared for the complete withdrawal from the town during the night of 6/7 November, to a new defensive line on the Wadi Hesi. Falkenhayn commanding Yildirim Army Group realised that the Ottoman forces could not hold the EEF any longer, and he ordered the Eighth and Seventh Armies to withdraw about 10 kilometres (6.2 mi). The first indications of the withdrawal were seen by EEF aerial reconnaissance, which reported Ottoman hospitals being moved back towards Mejdel. At midnight on 6/7 November, XXI Corps infantry patrols found Gaza had been evacuated by the Ottoman defenders. Until 6 November, German aircraft had rarely been seen over the Gaza lines, but that afternoon two R.E.8s and two B.E.12.as from No. 1 Squadron AFC patrolling and taking photographs were attacked and badly damaged by four Albatros aircraft.

Meanwhile, the heavy EEF bombardment of the Ottoman line in the XXI Corps area at Gaza, which had resumed on 3 November, grew in intensity with the naval guns joining in on 5 and 6 November, and it reached its maximum intensity on 6 November. During the night of 6/7 November the XXI Corps was to launch an attack on Outpost Hill and the Yunus and Belah trench systems, after the main EEF attack on Hareira and Sheria began. This attack on the Wadi esh Sheria was to be "carried out in the most favourable circumstances" against only two Ottoman regiments holding the 6.5-mile (10.5 km) line.

After launching the successful attack on 6 November against Hareira, the Sheria trenches were also attacked late in the day. These attacks were supported by renewed attacks in the Tel el Khuweilfe area at the eastern extremity of the Ottoman front line. During these attacks, the whole of the Kawukah trenches and part of the Rushdi system which protected Hareira Redoubt, were captured and the Ottoman defenders were forced to withdraw to the Hareira Redoubt. Late in the day a large part of the Sheria defences were also captured after Hareira was bypassed. Only Tel esh Sheria blocked the British advance and Allenby ordered the next day's attacks to continue on Tel esh Sheria, and to be renewed at Gaza. While these attacks took place on 6 November, EEF aircraft bombed Gaza, the main Ottoman positions behind the Kauwukah defences near Um Ameidat, and positions west of Sheria. Three air combats were also fought against three hostile aircraft during the day. Mejdel was also bombed by EEF aircraft. Allenby wrote:

We've had a successful day. We attacked the left of the Turkish positions, from N. of Beersheba, and have rolled them up as far as Sharia. The Turks fought well but have been badly defeated. Now, at 6 p.m., I am sending out orders to press in pursuit tomorrow. Gaza was not attacked; but I should not be surprised if this affected seriously her defenders. I am putting a lot of shell into them, and the Navy are still pounding them effectively.

— Allenby letter to Lady Allenby 6 November

=== 7 November ===
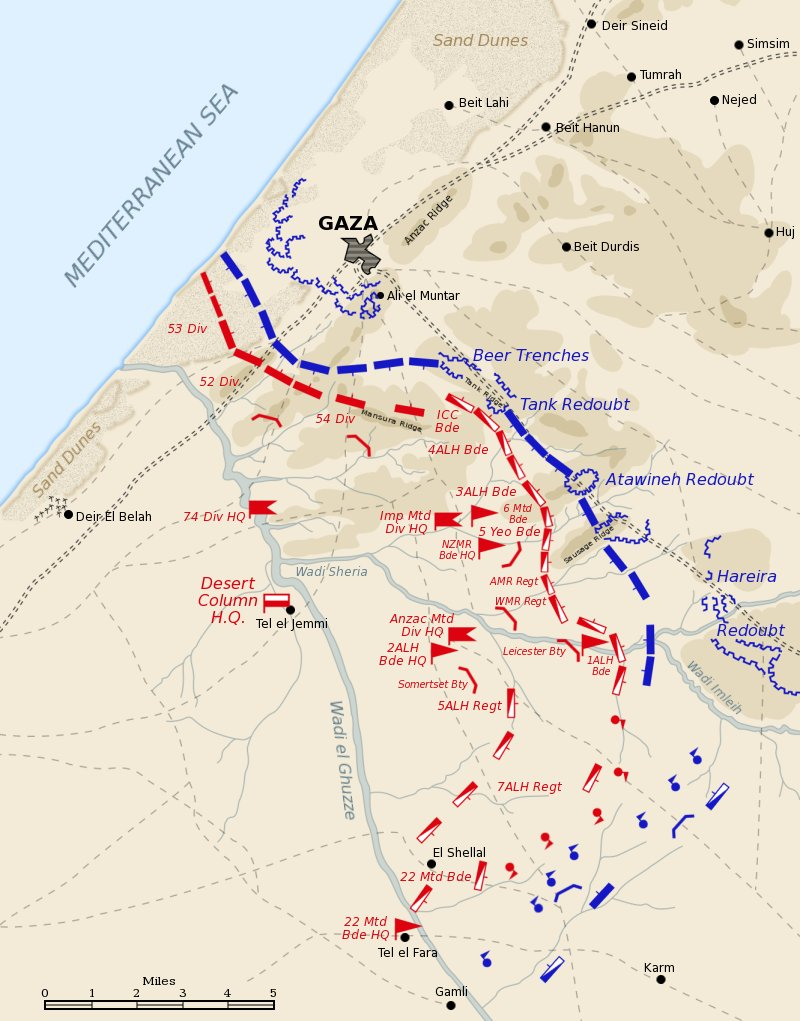
Gaza at 14:00 on 19 April 1917 during the Second Battle of Gaza shows the positions of Beer, Tank and Atawineh Redoubts as well as Sausage Ridge, Beit Hanun, Huj, Tel el Jemmi and Karm

==== Occupation of Gaza ====
The EEF's occupation of Gaza, which had a pre-war population of approximately 40,000, was not strongly resisted and a general advance during the morning of 7 November found the town abandoned. Orders for an attack at 04:50 by the 75th Division on Outpost Hill on the eastern side of Gaza had been issued; these were expanded to include Middlesex Hill and a 54th (East Anglian) Division attack on the Belah and Yunis trenches, and Turtle Hill in the coastal sector. However, by 04:35, two battalions each from the 161st and the 162nd Brigades (54th Division) supported by artillery had already advanced to occupy Lion and Tiger Trenches and Sheikh Redwan in the coastal sector to the north-north-west of Gaza. The advance by the 162nd Brigade took them through "the gardens and fields of Gaza to the main road northwards", when patrols sent into the city found it deserted; EEF artillery bombardments of Gaza had severely damaged or destroyed the majority of the city's housing. The 54th (East Anglian) Division subsequently took up a line stretching from the Jaffa road north of Sheikh Redwan to the Mediterranean sea.

When the Ottoman withdrawal became apparent on 7 November, the Royal Flying Corps—which had been mainly involved in strategic reconnaissance for the 40th (Army) Wing, artillery registration and tactical photography for the 5th (Corps) Wing—began bombing and machine gun air raids. For seven days, they also made numerous air attacks on Ottoman infrastructure including aerodromes, transport, artillery, and retreating columns.

==== Mounted breakthrough ====
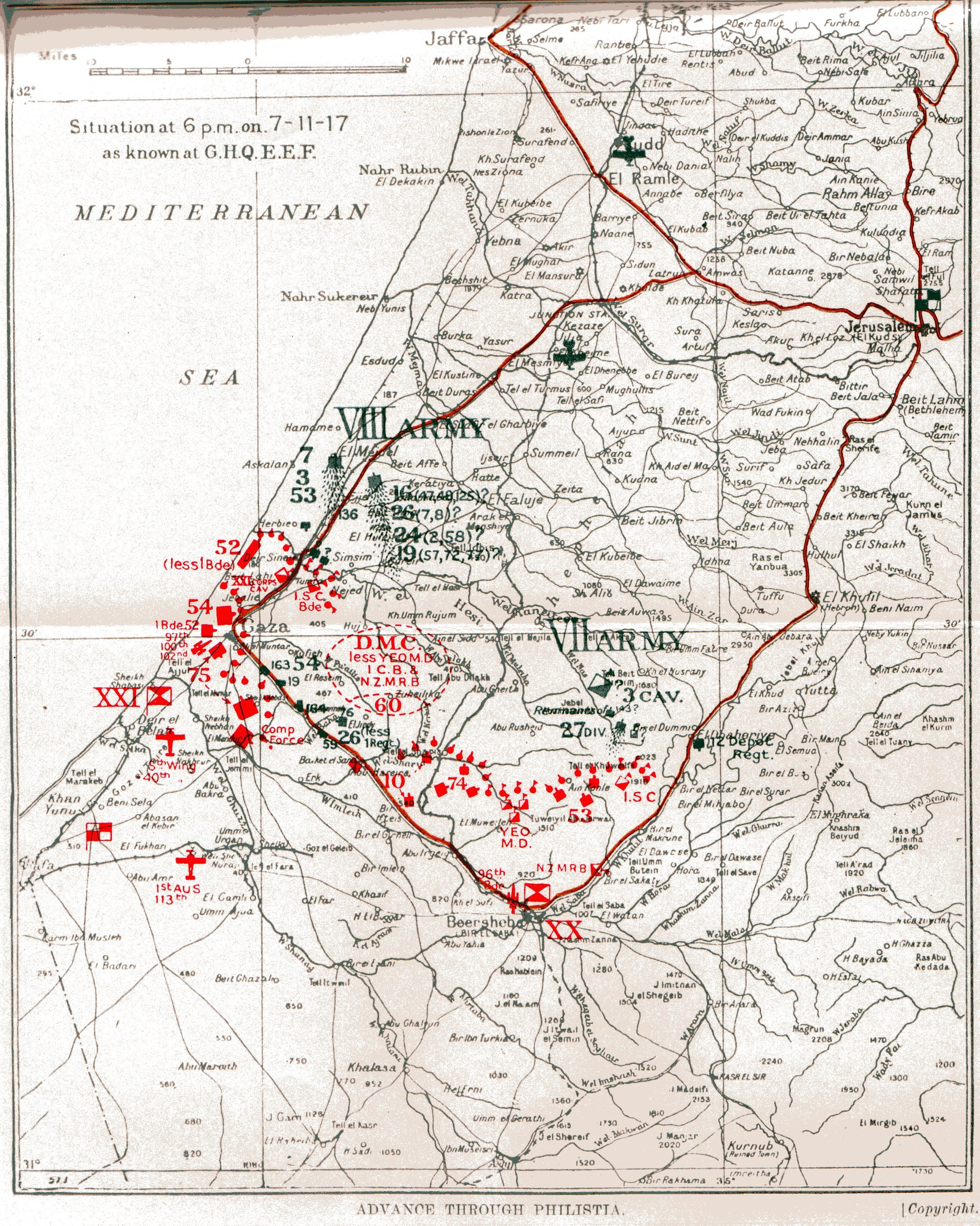
Situation as known to General Headquarters of the EEF at 18:00 7 November 1917

The 75th Division (XXI Corps) with the Imperial Service Cavalry Brigade attached had been ordered to attack Outpost Hill on the eastern side of Gaza, and exploit any potential breakthrough. By 01:00 on 7 November, the 233rd Brigade (75th Division) had already occupied Outpost Hill, and as the brigade moved forward to occupy Green Hill and the Labyrinth at 05:00, they were only opposed by individual riflemen. By 07:00, the 233rd Brigade had patrols on Ali Muntar ridge, while on their right, the 234th Brigade found that the Beer trenches and Road Redoubt defending the Gaza to Beersheba road were still held in strength with machine guns. Throughout the day the Ottoman rearguards in Tank and Atawineh Redoubts continued to fire their artillery at the increasing numbers of EEF troops advancing behind both these Ottoman rearguard's flanks. However, by nightfall, the Beer trenches, and the Road and Tank Redoubts had been captured.

The Imperial Service Cavalry Brigade, which had been carrying out patrolling duties based at Tel el Jemmi, was ready to exploit a breakthrough at Gaza, and the Anzac and Australian Mounted Divisions were also prepared for a pursuit through a breach in the line at Sheria. At 09:00, the Imperial Service Cavalry Brigade rode through the ruins of Gaza to reach Beit Hanun at 13:00, where they encountered part of the Gaza garrison defending a strong rearguard position on a ridge 1.5 miles (2.4 km) south-east of Beit Hanun. (Note: The Imperial Service Cavalry Brigade served in the Force in Egypt, defending the canal during the Raid on Suez Canal early in 1915, before serving on the EEF lines of communication. Now they operated under the direct command of Allenby. [Grainger 2006 pp. 128–9])

The Hyderabad and Mysore Lancers had advanced through Jebaliya to link with the Glasgow, Lancashire, and Hertfordshire squadrons of the XXI Corps Cavalry Regiment, holding the high ground at Beit Lahl five miles (8.0 km) north of Gaza, where they threatened the Ottoman flank. While the Corps Cavalry Regiment captured Beit Lahia, the Hyderabad Lancers advanced at 15:00 to capture the ridge west of Beit Hanun at Sheikh Munam, but the village was strongly defended by numerous Ottoman machine gun detachments. Early in the afternoon, a regiment of the 4th Light Horse Brigade rode across to the north-west to link with the Imperial Service Cavalry Brigade, which had been out of contact with the XX Corps and the Desert Mounted Corps. The 12th Light Horse Regiment (4th Light Horse Brigade) met up with the Imperial Service Cavalry Brigade one mile (1.6 km) east of Beit Hanun at 14:45. (Note: Falls and Paget state touch was gained at 15:00. [Paget 1994 Vol. 5 p. 187, Falls 1930 Vol. 2 p. 137]) Here they delivered orders for the Imperial Service Cavalry Brigade to attack the Ottoman rearguard on the Wadi el Hesi near Tumra to the north of Beit Hanun. (See sketch map showing the advance by the Imperial Service Cavalry Brigade and the 52nd (Lowland) Division on 7 November 1917). By 16:55, the rearguard was reported to still be holding Beit Hanun, with concentrations of Ottoman forces at Al Majdal (also known as el Mejdel and Ashkelon) and Beit Duras.

The lancers advanced from the east onto the ridge overlooking Beit Hanun, and despite meeting considerable resistance, captured the position. In the process, they secured twenty-three prisoners, some artillery pieces and a large quantity of ammunition. They also captured the town's water pumping machinery intact, but were forced to withdraw back to Jebaliye for water as the equipment ran on gas made from charcoal, which had to be converted before it could be used.

==== Infantry pursuit ====
While the 52nd (Lowland) Division was ordered by the XXI Corps to take up a line from the Jaffa road north of Sheikh Radwan to the sea on the northern outskirts of Gaza, the 157th Brigade (52nd Division) began the infantry pursuit by advancing along the shore, reaching Sheikh Hasan by 12:15. By 16:00, these troops were seen marching along the coast towards the mouth of the Wadi Hesi—the nearest likely defensive line north of Gaza. By dusk, the 157th Brigade had reached and crossed the Wadi el Hesi near its mouth seven miles (11 km) north of Gaza while the remainder of the XXI Corps occupied Gaza. (Note: It has been suggested the 54th (East Anglian) Division subsequently occupied the Wadi Hesi. [Keogh 1955 p. 161, Carver 2003 p. 218] However due to supply problems this division was forced to remain at Gaza. [Wavell 1968, pp. 150–1, Bruce 2002, pp. 147–9] It may be that the 54th (East Anglian) Division was confused with the Ottoman 54th Infantry Division (XX Corps, Eighth Army). [Wavell 1968, p. 114, Erickson 2007 p. 128]) Although dumps of rations, ammunition and engineer stores had been formed in concealed positions in the XXI Corps area before the battle, the corps was not in a position to move any distance. Almost all of their transport except ammunition tractors had been transferred to the XX Corps and the Desert Mounted Corps for their attack at the Battle of Beersheba.

=== 8 November ===
By the evening of 8 November, all the Ottoman positions of the Gaza to Beersheba line had been captured and the Eighth Army was in full retreat. In conjunction with the captures in the centre of the line at Sheria, the occupation of Gaza enabled a swift direct advance northwards, preventing a strong consolidation of the Wadi Hesi rearguard position. However, the Ottoman XXII Corps was not defeated at Gaza, but conducted a skillful, tactical retreat from the town, demonstrating both operational and tactical mobility. Late in the afternoon of 8 November, twenty-eight British and Australian aircraft flew over Huj, the headquarters of the Ottoman force, targeting German and Ottoman aerodromes, railway junctions, dumps, and troops in close formation with bombs and machine guns. Arak el Menshiye was raided twice during the day with two hundred bombs dropped, forty-eight hit ten hostile aircraft still on the ground. The next day, Et Tine was bombed, with at least nine hostile aircraft damaged. Virtually continual aerial attacks were made on railway stations, troops on the march and transport, while a German aircraft was shot down in flames near the Wadi Hesi.
