= HMS Medway =

Eleven ships and a shore establishment of the Royal Navy have been named HMS Medway, after the River Medway.

- HMS Medway (1693), a 60-gun fourth rate launched in 1693, rebuilt in 1718 and hulked in 1740. She was beached in 1748 and a sheer hulk and was broken up in 1749.
- HMS Medway (1742), a 60-gun fourth rate launched in 1742 and scuttled in 1748.
- HMS Medway (1755), a 60-gun fourth rate launched in 1755. She was used as a receiving ship after 1787, and was renamed HMS Arundel in 1802. She was broken up in 1811.
- HMS Medway (1756), a 6-gun storeship purchased in 1756. She was used as a dockyard craft in 1760 and was sold in 1764.
- HMS Medway (1812), a 74-gun third rate launched in 1812. She was used as a convict ship after 1847, and was sold in 1865.
- HMS Medway (1876), an iron-hulled screw gunboat launched in 1876 and sold in 1904.
- HMS Medway (1916), an M-class destroyer, originally to have been named HMS Redwing. This was changed to Medora in 1915, and then Medway before her launch in 1916. She was sold in 1921.
- HMS Medway (F25), a submarine depot ship launched in 1928 and sunk by U-372 in 1942.
- HMS Medway (shore establishment), were submarine base shore establishments in the Mediterranean, listed between 1942 and 1946. A number of ships were renamed HMS Medway II whilst serving as depot ships for the establishment, including:
  - HMS Talbot, previously HMS M29 was Medway II between 1944 and 1945.
  - HMS Bagshot was Medway II between 1945 and 1946.
- HMS Medway was the former Landing craft tank HMS LCT 1109. She was HMS Medway between 1959 and 1970 whilst serving as a submarine depot ship.
- HMS Medway (P223) is a River-class patrol vessel, she entered service in March 2019.

== See also ==
- HMS Medway Prize
- HMS Medway Queen
