= M29-class monitor =

1915 class of British monitors

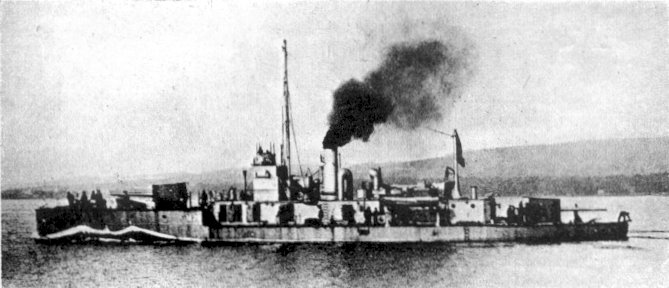

Class overview
- Name: M29-class monitor
- Builders: Harland & Wolff (3); Workman Clark (2)
- Operators: Royal Navy
- Preceded by: M15 class
- Succeeded by: Erebus class
- Completed: 5
- Lost: 1
- Preserved: 1

General characteristics
- Class & type: Monitor
- Displacement: 535 tons
- Length: 170 ft (52 m)
- Beam: 31 ft (9.4 m)
- Draught: 6 ft 9 in (2.06 m)
- Propulsion: Triple expansion; Twin screw propellers; Yarrow oil fuel 45 tons boilers; 400 hp (300 kW)
- Speed: 10 knots (19 km/h)
- Complement: 75
- Armament: 2 × BL 6-inch (152.4 mm) Mk XII guns; 1 × 6-pounder AA; 1 × 3-inch (76 mm) AA gun for M31 and M33
- Armour: 1–3 in magazine box protection; 2.25 in belt; 1 in deck, turrets and bulkheads

The M29 class comprised five monitors of the Royal Navy, all built and launched during 1915.

The ships of this class were ordered in March, 1915, as part of the Emergency War Programme of ship construction. The contract for construction was granted to Harland & Wolff, Belfast, who sub-contracted the construction of M32 and M33 to Workman, Clark and Company.

The main armament of the ships, two 6-inch Mk XII guns, came from guns originally intended for the five Queen Elizabeth-class battleships which became surplus when their aft casemate mountings turned out to be unworkable and were dispensed with.

== Ships of the class ==
- HMS M29 – launched on 22 May 1915 and later renamed Medusa and Talbot, she was sold in 1946.
- HMS M30 – launched on 23 June 1915, and sunk on 14 May 1916.
- HMS M31 – launched on 24 June 1915, and broken up for scrap in 1948.
- HMS M32 – launched on 22 May 1915, and sold in January 1920.
- HMS M33 – launched on 22 May 1915, is one of a number of World War I-era warships in existence today and is located in dry-dock near HMS Victory at Portsmouth Naval Base. It has been restored and is open to public.
