= HMS Medway Prize =

Three ships of the Royal Navy have borne the name Medway Prize or Medway's Prize, the name being given to vessels that had been captured and taken as prizes by one of the Royal Navy ships named HMS Medway. In this instance all of the ships were captured by the same HMS Medway:

- HMS Medway Prize (1697) was a 48-gun fourth rate captured from the French in 1697. She was hulked in 1699 and was sunk as a foundation in 1712.
- HMS Medway Prize (1704) was a 28-gun sixth rate captured from the French in 1704. She was sold in 1713.
- HMS Medway's Prize (1744) was a fifth rate previously named Favorette, captured from the French in 1744. She was sold in 1749.

== See also ==
- HMS Medway
- HMS Medway Queen
