= HMS M30 =

M29-class monitor

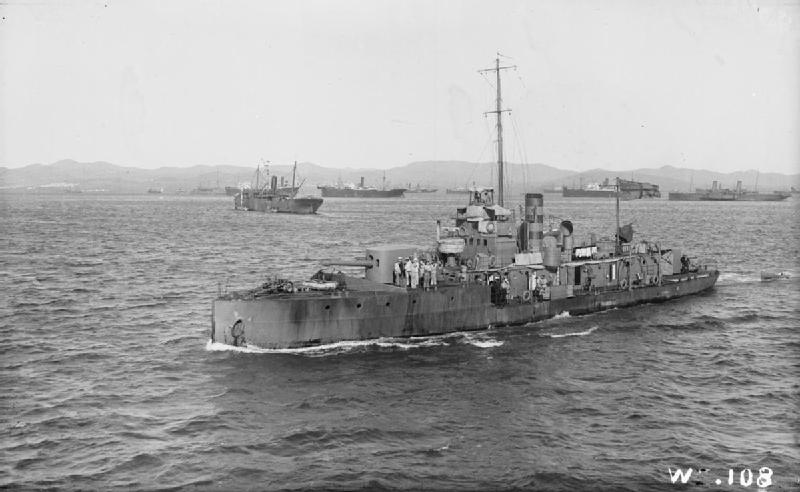

History

United Kingdom
- Name: HMS M30
- Builder: Harland & Wolff, Belfast
- Yard number: 486
- Laid down: March 1915
- Launched: 23 June 1915
- Completed: 9 July 1915
- Fate: Sunk by shore batteries Gulf of Smyrna 14 May 1916

General characteristics
- Class & type: M29 class monitor
- Displacement: 580 tons deep load
- Length: 177 ft 3 in (54.03 m)
- Beam: 31 ft (9.4 m)
- Draught: 5 ft 11 in (1.80 m)
- Propulsion: Triple expansion. Twin screws. Yarrow oil fuel 45 tons boilers. 400 hp (300 kW)
- Speed: 10 knots (19 km/h)
- Complement: 72
- Armament: 2 × BL 6-inch (152.4 mm) Mk XII guns; 1 × 6-pounder AA
- Armour: 6 in on gun shield

HMS M30 was a Royal Navy M29-class monitor of the First World War.

The availability of ten 6 inch Mk XII guns from the Queen Elizabeth-class battleships in 1915 prompted the Admiralty to order five scaled down versions of the M15-class monitors, which had been designed to use 9.2 inch guns. HMS M30 and her sisters were ordered from Harland & Wolff, Belfast in March 1915. Launched on 23 June 1915, she was completed in July 1915.

Upon completion, HMS M30 was sent to the Mediterranean. Whilst enforcing the Allied blockade in the Gulf of Smyrna, HMS M30 came under fire from the Austro-Hungarian howitzer battery 36 supporting the Turkish, and was sunk on 14 May 1916.
