= HMS M31 =

M29-class monitor

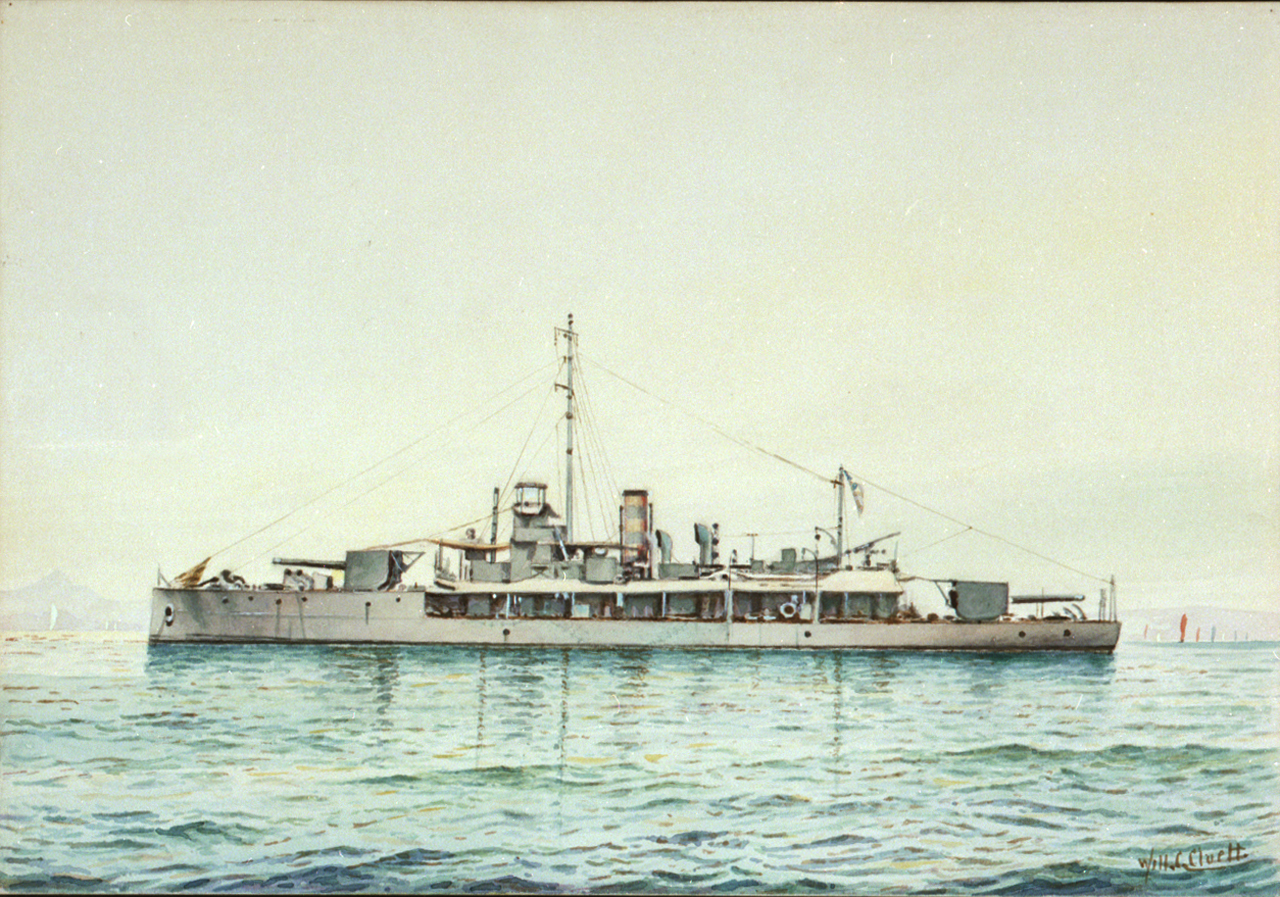
- Painting of M31 in 1916

History

United Kingdom
- Name: HMS M31
- Ordered: 15 March 1915
- Builder: Harland & Wolff, Belfast
- Yard number: 487
- Laid down: March 1915
- Launched: 24 June 1915
- Completed: 9 July 1915
- Fate: Sold 1948 and broken up at Llanelly

General characteristics
- Class & type: M29-class monitor
- Displacement: 580 tons deep load
- Length: 177 ft 3 in (54.03 m)
- Beam: 31 ft (9.4 m)
- Draught: 5 ft 11 in (1.80 m)
- Propulsion: Triple expansion. Twin screws. Yarrow oil fuel 45 tons boilers. 400 hp (300 kW)
- Speed: 10 knots (19 km/h)
- Complement: 72
- Armament: 2 × BL 6 in (152 mm) Mk XII guns; 1 × 6-pounder AA
- Armour: 6 inches on gun shield

HMS M31 was an M29-class monitor of the Royal Navy.

The availability of ten 6 inch Mk XII guns from the Queen Elizabeth-class battleships in 1915 prompted the Admiralty to order five scaled down versions of the M15-class monitors, which had been designed to utilise 9.2 inch guns. HMS M31 and her sisters were ordered from Harland & Wolff, Belfast in March 1915. Launched on 24 June 1915, she was completed in July 1915. Upon completion, HMS M31 was sent to the Mediterranean, and remained there until March, 1919.

In 1916, she defended the port city of Yanbo, in Saudi Arabia, against the Turkish army by providing artillery cover for the Arab rebels. She served from May to September 1919 in support of British and White Russian forces in the White Sea, before returning to England.

In September 1923, HMS M31 was taken in hand for conversion to a minelayer. Equipped to carry 52 mines, she was renamed HMS Melpomene in December 1925. She was assigned to HMS Defiance the Torpedo School at Devonport. In September, 1939 she was converted to a torpedo training vessel, fitted with one 21 inch torpedo tube on the forecastle.

She was renamed HMS Menelaus in 1941, and was finally sold in 1948 and broken up at Llanelly.
