= HMS M32 =

M29-class monitor

History

United Kingdom
- Name: HMS M32
- Ordered: 15 March 1915
- Builder: Workman Clark, Belfast for Harland & Wolff
- Yard number: 488
- Laid down: March 1915
- Launched: 22 May 1915
- Completed: 20 June 1915
- Fate: Sold 29 January 1920

General characteristics
- Class & type: M29-class monitor
- Displacement: 580 tons deep load
- Length: 177 ft 3 in (54.03 m)
- Beam: 31 ft (9.4 m)
- Draught: 5 ft 11 in (1.80 m)
- Propulsion: Triple expansion. Twin screws. Yarrow oil fuel 45 tons boilers. 400 hp (300 kW)
- Speed: 10 knots (19 km/h)
- Complement: 72
- Armament: 2 × BL 6-inch (152.4 mm) Mk XII guns; 1 × 6-pounder AA
- Armour: 6 in on gun shield

HMS M32 was an M29-class monitor of the Royal Navy.

The availability of ten 6 inch Mk XII guns from the Queen Elizabeth-class battleships in 1915 prompted the Admiralty to order five scaled down versions of the M15-class monitors, which had been designed to use 9.2 inch guns. HMS M32 and her sisters were ordered from Harland & Wolff, Belfast in March 1915. However, HMS M32 and her sister HMS M33 were sub-contracted to the nearby Workman Clark Limited shipyard. Launched on 22 May 1915, she was completed in June 1915.

Upon completion, HMS M32 was sent to the Mediterranean. She later took part in the Battle of Jaffa and remained there until March 1919. She served from May to September 1919 in support of British and White Russian forces in the White Sea, before returning to England.

HMS M32 was sold on 29 January 1920 for use as an oil tanker, and named Ampat.
