= HMS M29 =

M29-class monitor

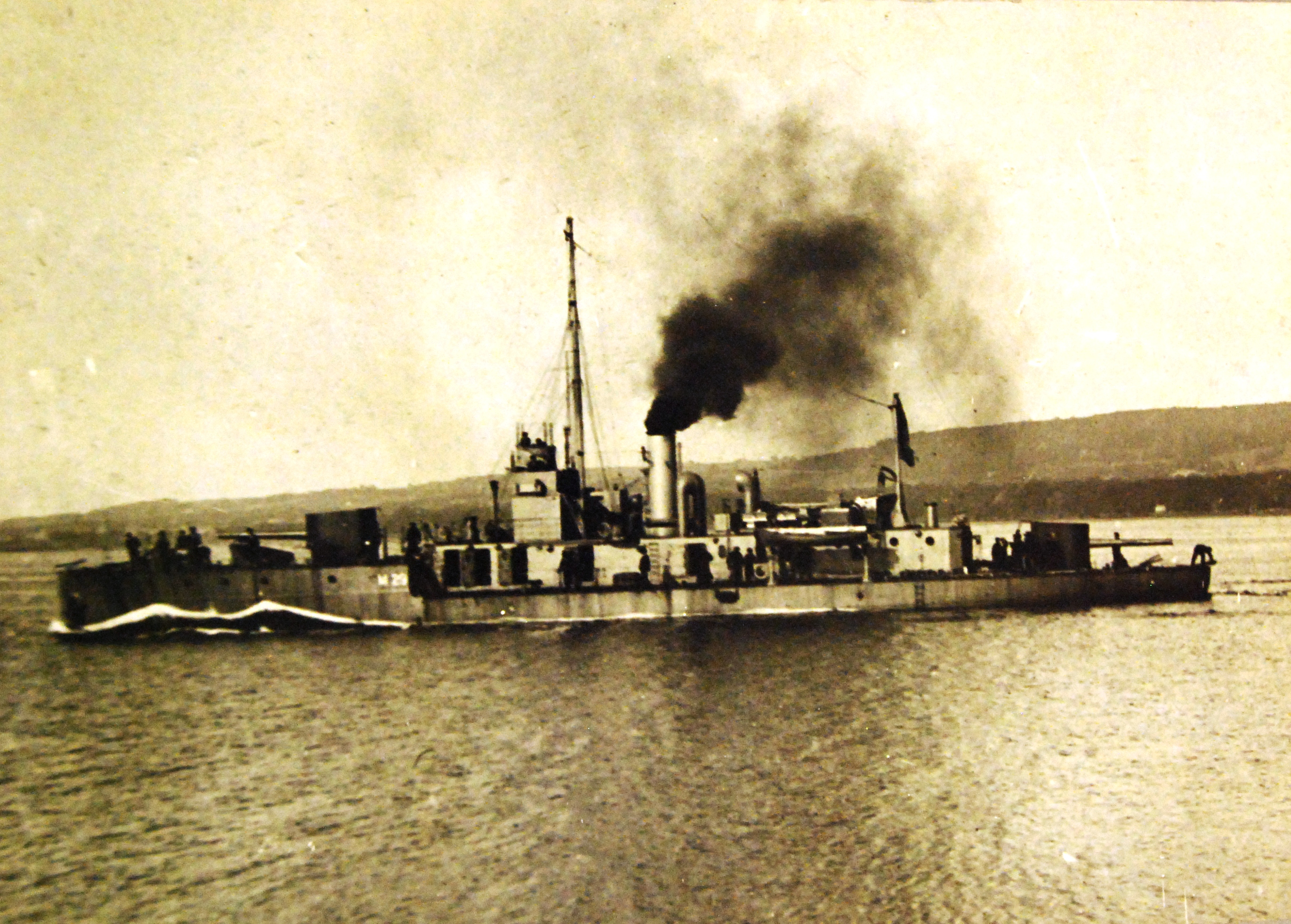

History

United Kingdom
- Name: HMS M29
- Builder: Harland & Wolff, Belfast
- Yard number: 485
- Laid down: March 1915
- Launched: 22 May 1915
- Completed: 20 June 1915
- Fate: Sold 1946 for breaking at Dover; resold and rebuilt as merchantman. Scrapped 1974.

General characteristics
- Class & type: M29-class monitor
- Displacement: 580 tons deep load
- Length: 177 ft 3 in (54.03 m)
- Beam: 31 ft (9.4 m)
- Draught: 5 ft 11 in (1.80 m)
- Propulsion: Triple expansion. Twin screws. Yarrow boilers, 45 tons oil fuel. 400 hp (300 kW)
- Speed: 10 knots (19 km/h; 12 mph)
- Complement: 72
- Armament: 2 × BL 6-inch (152.4 mm) Mk XII guns; 1 × 6-pounder AA
- Armour: 6 in on gun shield

HMS M29 was a Royal Navy M29-class monitor of the First World War. The ship was constructed by Harland & Wolff, in Belfast and launched on 22 May 1915, she was completed in June 1915. During World War I, the monitor served in the Mediterranean Sea at the Battle of Jaffa in 1917 and took part in operations in support of British and White Russian forces in the White Sea during the Russian Civil War in 1919. The ship was then converted to a minelayer and renamed HMS Medusa in 1925. In 1941 Medusa was converted to a repair and depot ship and was renamed HMS Talbot, then renamed HMS Medway II in 1944. In 1946, the vessel was sold for scrap.

However, the ship was given a reprieve and acquired by a Greek shipowner who rebuilt the vessel as a cargo ship in 1950–1951. The ship, renamed Gerogeorgakis was used for smuggling and was seized off Cavallo Island in 1971. The ship was then sold at auction and broken up for scrap in 1974.

== Construction and career ==
The availability of ten 6-inch Mk XII guns from the Queen Elizabeth-class battleships in 1915 prompted the Admiralty to order five scaled down versions of the M15-class monitors, which had been designed to utilise 9.2-inch guns. HMS M29 and her sisters were ordered from Harland & Wolff, Belfast in March 1915. Launched on 22 May 1915, she was completed in June 1915.

Upon completion, M29 was sent to the Mediterranean, and took part in the Battle of Jaffa and remained there until December 1918. She served from May to September 1919 in support of British and White Russian forces in the White Sea, before returning to England.

In September 1923, M29 was taken in hand for conversion to a minelayer. Equipped to carry 52 mines, she was renamed HMS Medusa in December 1925.

In May 1941, she was converted to a repair ship and became the depot ship for the 10th Submarine Flotilla, being renamed HMS Talbot. Again renamed HMS Medway II in February 1944, she became the depot ship for the 1st Submarine Flotilla. She was finally sold in December 1946 for breaking up at Dover.

Resold circa 1950 to Spyros Theodoratos, Greece and registered on January 21, 1951, at Lavrion (Nr. 7) as Gerogeogakis. Rebuilt at Perama as cargo motorship. Sold in 1956 to Elpida & Panagiotis Leivadas. On 16 November 1971 Gerogeogakis was intercepted off Cavallo Island, Corse, with a cargo of 12 tons of smuggled cigarettes. Seized and auctioned in 1974 for breaking up at Vado Ligure.
