= HMS Rosemary =

1915 British ship

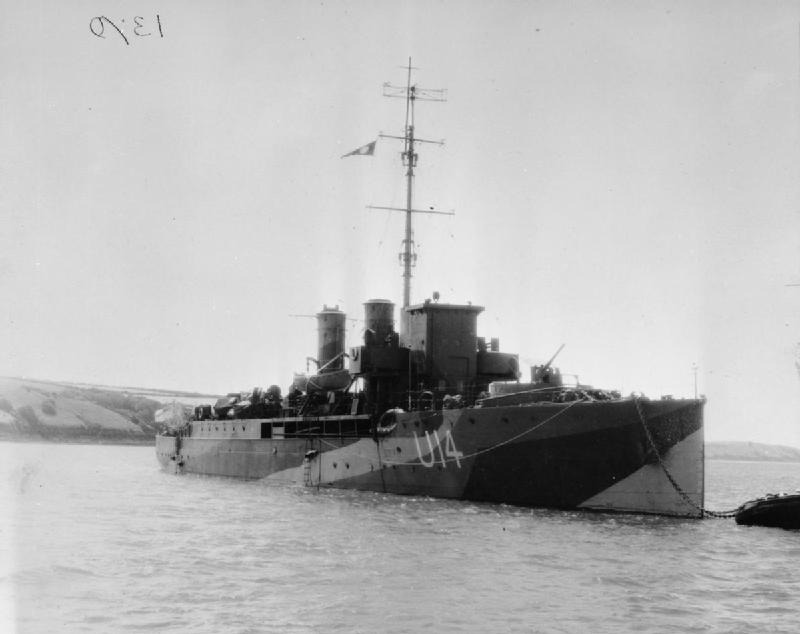
- Rosemary during the Second World War

History

United Kingdom
- Name: HMS Rosemary
- Operator: Royal Navy
- Builder: Richardson, Duck and Company, Thornaby-on-Tees
- Yard number: No 661
- Launched: 22 November 1915
- Completed: 5 February 1916
- Fate: Sold for scrap 1947

General characteristics
- Type: Minesweeper
- Displacement: 1,200 long tons (1,200 t)
- Length: 267 ft 9 in (81.61 m) o/a
- Beam: 33 ft 6 in (10.21 m)
- Draught: 11 ft 0 in (3.35 m)
- Propulsion: 1 × 4-cylinder triple expansion engine; 2 × cylindrical boilers; 1 screw
- Speed: 17 knots (31 km/h; 20 mph)
- Complement: 79 men
- Armament: Typically 2 × 4 or 4.7-inch guns and 2 × 3-pounder (47 mm) AA guns

HMS Rosemary was an Arabis-class minesweeping sloop of the British Royal Navy. Built by the Teesside shipbuilder Richardson, Duck and Company from 1915–1916, Rosemary carried out minesweeping and anti submarine operations during the First World War. She was used for fishery protection duties during the 1930s, and served through the Second World War, finally being sold for scrap in 1947.

== Design and construction ==
The Arabis class was a slightly enlarged and improved derivative of the previous Acacia-class and Azalea-class sloops. (Note: Together with the following Aubrietia class and Anchusa class, these classes were collectively known as Flower-class sloops.) They were designed at the start of the First World War as relatively fast minesweepers that could also carry out various miscellaneous duties in support of the fleet such as acting as dispatch vessels or carrying out towing operations, but as the war continued and the threat from German submarines grew, became increasingly involved in anti-submarine duties.

Rosemary was 268 ft (81.69 m) long overall and 255 ft (77.72 m) between perpendiculars, with a beam of 33 ft 6 in (10.21 m) and a draught of 11 ft (3.35 m). Displacement was 1,200 long tons (1,200 t) normal. Two cylindrical boilers fed steam to a four-cylinder triple expansion steam engine rated at 2,000 ihp (1,500 kW), giving a speed of 16 knots (30 km/h; 18 mph). The Arabis class had a main armament of two 4.7-inch (120 mm) guns or two 4-inch (102 mm) guns, with two 3-pounder (47 mm) anti-aircraft guns also carried. By 1929, Rosemary was listed as having an armament of a single 4-inch gun and two 2-pounder "pom-pom" anti-aircraft guns.

Rosemary was part of the third batch of six Arabis-class sloops ordered by the British Admiralty on 27 July 1915. The ship was laid down by Richardson, Duck and Company as yard number 661, and launched at their Thornaby-on-Tees shipyard on 22 November 1915, and was accepted into service on 5 February 1916.

== Service ==
=== First World War ===
After commissioning, Rosemary joined the 10th Sloop Flotilla, replacing sister ship Arabis, sunk in a clash with German torpedo boats on 10 February 1916. The flotilla, including Rosemary, carried out minesweeping operations in the North Sea on 19–21 to clear 'L channel', the route from the Firth of Forth to the North Sea, completing the sweeping operations that had been interrupted by the Germans on 10 February. On the morning of 4 July 1916, the 10th Sloop Flotilla was again carrying out sweeps of the routes to the German Bight used by the Grand Fleet. Rosemary reported sighting a submarine astern at 6:25 am, but the commander of the flotilla paid little importance to the report and the sweeping operations continued. At 9:25 am, the sloop Alyssum, which was working with Rosemary, sighted two torpedoes which she avoided, but one of the torpedoes, which had been fired by the German submarine U-63, hit Rosemary, blowing off Rosemary's stern. Rosemary was taken under tow by Alyssum and escorted back to the Humber by the rest of the flotilla. Three of Rosemary's crew were killed.

In February 1917, as a result of the German resumption of unrestricted submarine warfare, and the resulting heavy shipping losses in the Western Approaches, Rosemary, together with the rest of the 10th Sloop Flotilla, was transferred to Queenstown (now Cobh) in the South of Ireland, to be deployed on escort duties. On 17 March 1917, Rosemary and sister sloop Mignonette were minesweeping off Gally Head, County Cork when Mignonette struck a mine. Rosemary took Mignonette in tow, but a bulkhead aboard the damaged sloop soon failed, and Mignonette sank. By July that year, Rosemary had transferred to the Northern division of the Coast of Ireland Station, with headquarters at Buncrana. On 6 August 1917, Rosemary was part of the escort for Convoy HH.11, bound from Newport News to Glasgow and 81 nmi (150 km; 93 mi) west-northwest of Tory Island when the merchant ship Argalia was torpedoed and sunk by the German submarine U-94. None of the escort spotted the submarine. On 12 December 1917, Rosemary was part of a force of three destroyers and three sloops en route to rendezvous with a convoy when she was in collision with the destroyer Wolverine, with Wolverine sinking as a result. Two of Wolverine's crew were killed. The collision was blamed on the bridge crew of Rosemary.

By June 1918, Rosemary had transferred to the Northern Patrol, and was listed as part of the 3rd Sloop Flotilla the next month. Rosemary remained part of the 3rd Sloop Flotilla, based at Dundee at the end of the war on 11 November 1918.

=== Between the wars ===
By December 1918, Rosemary had transferred to the 23rd Fleet Sweeping Flotilla, part of the Northern division of the Coast of Ireland Station, serving as Senior Officer's Ship. She was employed on post-war mine clearance duties. Rosemary continued to be used for mine clearance duties in August 1919, but by September that year, had been laid up.

In 1929, while part of the Fishery Protection and Minesweeping Flotilla, Rosemary spent four months carrying out survey operations near Rockall and between Iceland and the Faroe Islands, primarily in support of the fishing industry, and in particular to search for new fishing grounds. Rosemary continued these survey operations in June 1930. The Rosemary Bank, a seamount to the west of Scotland, was discovered by Rosemary during these surveys and was named after the sloop.

In February 1930, Rosemary was carrying out a fishery protection patrol off Murmansk when she was diverted to search for the trawler St. Louis, which had not been heard from since leaving Hull on 8 January bound for the fishing grounds off Bear Island. Rosemary met up with the sloop Harebell, and the two sloops searched deep into Arctic waters, to within 100 nmi (190 km; 120 mi) of the Arctic ice pack, the farthest North any Royal Navy ships had been for many years. They then continued the search down to Lerwick in the Shetland Islands. In September 1930, Rosemary, recently returned from patrols off Iceland, was ordered to reduce to reserve at Portsmouth. Rosemary was again part of the Fishery Protection and Minesweeping Flotilla, based at Portsmouth in August 1935. Rosemary was refitted in 1937, after which she was returned to the Reserve, being considered still useful in subsidiary roles in the event of a war.

=== Second World War ===
Rosemary returned to active service during the Second World War, recommissioning on 30 September 1939, and escorting convoys to France in the early months of the war. On 12 February 1940, Rosemary attacked a submarine contact near Start Point, with the sloop Sandwich and the destroyer Broke joining in the hunt for the submarine, which continued into the next day. In June 1940, Rosemary took part in Operation Aerial, the evacuation of Allied troops from ports in Western France, escorting evacuation shipping.

On 24 April 1943, two landing craft, LCG 15 and LCG 16, were on passage from Belfast to Falmouth, Cornwall, testing their seaworthiness, when they encountered a storm and heavy seas off the Pembrokeshire coast. They were denied permission to put into Fishguard and Milford Haven, but reached Freshwater Bay. After they began taking on water faster than the vessels' pumps could remove it, they radioed for help. The St Davids lifeboat did not arrive for over eight hours, when it was too dark to help. LCG 15 sank on 25 April, while Rosemary arrived on the scene later that day, launching a boat to try to rescue LCG 16's crew. This boat capsized, however, killing all six aboard, and on 26 April LCG 16 also sank, with all hands lost. In all, seventy-three died near Freshwater West from the two landing craft, along with the six men from Rosemary. A memorial to the seventy-nine that lost their lives was unveiled at Freshwater West on 25 April 2013.

== Disposal ==
Rosemary was sold for demolition to the shipbreakers Thos. W. Ward on 17 December 1947 and scrapped at their Milford Haven works.
