= HMS Myrtle =

1915 British ship

History

United Kingdom
- Name: HMS Myrtle
- Builder: Lobnitz, Renfrew
- Yard number: No 806
- Launched: 11 October 1915
- Completed: November 1915
- Fate: Hit a mine on 16 July 1919

General characteristics
- Type: Minesweeper
- Displacement: 1,210 tons
- Length: 255 ft 3 in (77.80 m) p/p; 267 ft 9 in (81.61 m) o/a
- Beam: 33 ft 6 in (10.21 m)
- Draught: 11 ft 9 in (3.58 m)
- Propulsion: 1 × 4-cylinder triple expansion engine; 2 × cylindrical boilers; 1 screw
- Speed: 17 knots (31 km/h)
- Range: 2,000 nmi (3,700 km) at 15 kn (28 km/h) with max. 260 tons of coal
- Complement: 79 men
- Armament: 2 × 1 – QF 4 inch Mk IV guns, BL 4 inch Mk IX guns or QF 4.7 inch Mk IV guns and 2 × 1 – 3-pounders (47 mm) AA. A few had no 3-pounders.

HMS Myrtle was an Azalea-class sloop that was part of a Royal Navy squadron that was sent to assist the Baltic States and their fight for independence. While clearing naval mines on 16 July 1919 both Myrtle and HMS Gentian hit mines and sank. The two blasts killed nine sailors.

== Design and construction ==
The Azalea class was based on the previous Acacia class, but with a heavier gun armament. (Note: Together with the following Arabis class, Aubrietia class and Anchusa class, these classes were collectively known as Flower-class sloops.) They were designed at the start of the First World War as relatively fast minesweepers that could also carry out various miscellaneous duties in support of the fleet such as acting as dispatch vessels or carrying out towing operations, but as the war continued and the threat from German submarines grew, became increasingly involved in anti-submarine duties.

Myrtle was 262 ft 6 in (80.01 m) long overall and 250 ft (76.20 m) between perpendiculars, with a beam of 33 ft (10.06 m) and a draught of 11 ft (3.35 m). Displacement was 1,210 long tons (1,230 t) normal. Two cylindrical boilers fed steam to a triple expansion steam engine rated at 1,800 ihp (1,300 kW), giving a speed of 16.5 knots (30.6 km/h; 19.0 mph). The Azeleas had a main armament of two 4.7-inch (120 mm) or 4-inch (102 mm) guns, with two 3-pounder (47 mm) anti-aircraft guns also carried. Myrtle had a crew of 90 officers and other ranks.

Myrtle was ordered on 4 May 1915 from the Scottish shipbuilder Lobnitz, and was built at their Renfrew shipyard as yard number 806. She was launched on 11 October 1915, and was completed on 16 December 1915.

== Service ==
On commissioning, Myrtle was attached to the Grand Fleet. The duties of the sloops attached to the Grand Fleet were mainly confined to keeping the approaches to the Fleet's anchorage at Scapa Flow clear of mines, with daily sweeping of the prescribed channels. By July 1916, the Grand Fleet's minesweepers had been split into three Flotillas, with Myrtle joining the 1st Fleetsweeping Flotilla. Myrtle was still part of the 1st Minesweeping Flotilla, by now based at Granton, Edinburgh at the end of the war in November 1918.

=== Baltic deployment and loss ===
The British campaign in the Baltic was a part of the Allied intervention in the Russian Civil War. The codename of the Royal Navy campaign was "Operation Red Trek". The intervention played a key role in enabling the establishment of the independent states of Estonia and Latvia but failed to secure the control of Petrograd by White Russian forces, which was one of the main goals of the campaign. The taskforce was vital in supplying the Baltic states as well as containing the Soviet navies.

On 26 June 1919, the 1st Fleet Sweeping Flotilla arrived at Biorko to reinforce the British forces in the Baltic. On 16 July, (Note: 15 July according to Dunn, 16 July according to Dittmar and Colledge, Gardiner and Gray, Kemp, and Gibson and Prendergast.) four sloops of the 1st Flotilla, Myrtle, Gentian, Lilac and Lupin, were employed sweeping mines east of Saaremaa. The sloops worked in pairs, towing a sweep between the two ships, which steamed about 500 yd (460 m) apart, with Myrtle working with Gentian. During the afternoon, Myrtle and Gentian were attempting to sink mines that had been brought to the surface by Lilac and Lupin's sweep when Gentian struck an unswept mine. Myrtle went to Gentian's assistance, but also stuck a mine, which broke off the fore part of the ship and killed six. Myrtle sank 90 minutes after striking the mine. Myrtle's commanding officer, Lieutenant Commander Richard Scott, was awarded the Bronze Albert Medal for Lifesaving for his actions during the sinking, returning alone to the ship to search it for a missing man.

== Wreck ==
In July 2010 an Estonian minesweeper located the remains of the cruiser HMS Cassandra, HMS Myrtle and HMS Gentian.

The wreck of the Myrtle was first discovered in 1934, but it was later forgotten. Myrtle was rediscovered in 1990 by the survey vessel GS-214 Girokompas and was localized on 2nd of July 1999 by the Estonian Maritime Museum.

Myrtle´s wreck is at a depth of 35 meters. The wreck is upright on the keel, missing its bow section, its funnels have fallen and it is slightly buried in mud.

== Bibliography ==
- Brown, D. K. (2010). The Grand Fleet: Warship Design and Development 1906–1922. Barnsley, UK: Seaforth Publishing. ISBN 978-1-84832-085-7.
- Dittmar, F.J.; Colledge, J.J. (1972). British Warships 1914–1919. Shepperton, UK: Ian Allan. ISBN 0-7110-0380-7.
- Dorling, Taprell (1935). Swept Channels: Being and Account of the Work of the Minesweepers in the Great War. London: Hodder and Stoughton.
- Dunn, Steve R. (2020). Battle in the Baltic: The Royal Navy and the Fight to Save Estonia & Latvia 1918–20. Barnsley, UK: Seaforth Publishing. ISBN 978-1-5267-4273-5.
- Gardiner, Robert; Gray, Randal, eds. (1985). Conway's All The World's Fighting Ships 1906–1921. London: Conway Maritime Press. ISBN 0-85177-245-5.
- Gibson, R.H. & Prendergast, Maurice (2002) [1931]. The German Submarine War 1914–1918. Penzance, UK: Periscope Publishing. ISBN 9781904381082.
- Kemp, Paul (1999). The Admiralty Regrets: British Warship Losses of the 20th Century. Stroud, UK: Sutton Publishing Limited. ISBN 0-7509-1567-6.
- Kinvig, Clifford (2006). Churchill's Crusade: The British Invasion of Russia, 1918–1920. A & C Black. ISBN 9781852854775.
- Langworth, Richard (23 April 2017). "Churchill and the Baltic, Part 1". Hillsdale College.
- Wainwright, Martin (23 August 2010). "British warships sunk 90 years ago found off Estonian coast". The Guardian.
- Wright, Damien (2017). Churchill's Secret War With Lenin: British and Commonwealth Military Intervention in the Russian Civil War, 1918–20. Helion and Company. ISBN 9781913118112.
