= Aubrietia (disambiguation) =

Aubrietia is a synonym for any of the approximately 20 species of trailing, purple-flowered plants of the genus Aubrieta, part of the mustard family, Brassicaceae.

Aubrietia may also refer to:

== Military ==
- HMS Aubrietia, name of two ships of the Royal Navy
  - HMS Aubrietia (1916), an Aubrietia-class sloop launched in 1916 and sold in 1922
  - HMS Aubrietia (K96), a Flower-class corvette, launched in 1940 and sold in 1946

== Other uses ==
- Aubrieta deltoidea, a species of flowering plant in the mustard family

== See also ==
- Aubertia (skipper), a family of butterflies
