= HMS Gentian (1915) =

1915 British ship

History

United Kingdom
- Name: Gentian
- Builder: Greenock & Grangemouth Dockyard Co. Ltd.
- Yard number: No 376
- Launched: 23 December 1915
- Completed: February 1916
- Fate: Sunk 15 or 16 July 1919

General characteristics
- Class & type: Arabis-class sloop
- Displacement: 1,250 tons
- Length: 255 ft 3 in (77.80 m) p/p; 267 ft 9 in (81.61 m) o/a
- Beam: 33 ft 6 in (10.21 m)
- Draught: 11 ft 9 in (3.58 m)
- Propulsion: 1 × 4-cylinder triple expansion engine; 2 × cylindrical boilers; 1 screw
- Speed: 17 knots (31 km/h; 20 mph)
- Range: 2,000 nmi (3,700 km; 2,300 mi) at 15 kn (28 km/h; 17 mph) with max. 260 tons of coal
- Complement: 79 men
- Armament: Typically 2 × 4 or 4.7-inch guns and 2 × 3-pounder (47 mm) AA guns with some lesser variants

HMS Gentian was an Arabis-class sloop that was sent to assist the Baltic States and their fight for independence. While clearing mines on 15 or 16 July 1919, according to different sources, (Note: Two dates are given as when the ships were sunk The Globe and Mail says 15 July while the book The German Submarine War 1914-1918 says 16 July) Gentian and the sloop HMS Myrtle both hit mines and sank with the loss of nine sailors.

== Design and construction ==
The Arabis class was a slightly enlarged and improved derivative of the previous Acacia-class and Azalea-class sloops. (Note: Together with the following Aubrietia class and Anchusa class, these classes were collectively known as Flower-class sloops.) They were designed at the start of the First World War as relatively fast minesweepers that could also carry out various miscellaneous duties in support of the fleet such as acting as dispatch vessels or carrying out towing operations, but as the war continued and the threat from German submarines grew, became increasingly involved in anti-submarine duties.

Gentian was 268 ft (81.69 m) long overall and 255 ft (77.72 m) between perpendiculars, with a beam of 33 ft 6 in (10.21 m) and a draught of 11 ft (3.35 m). Displacement was 1,250 long tons (1,270 t) normal. Two cylindrical boilers fed steam to a four-cylinder triple expansion steam engine rated at 2,000 ihp (1,500 kW), giving a speed of 16 kn (18 mph; 30 km/h). The Arabis class had a main armament of two 4.7-inch (120 mm) guns or two 4-inch (102 mm) guns, with two 3-pounder (47 mm) anti-aircraft guns also carried.

Gentian was one of the first nine Arabis-class ships, ordered on 6 July 1915. She was built by the Greenock & Grangemouth Dockyard Company at their Greenock shipyard as Yard number 376, was launched on 23 December 1915, and was completed on 28 February 1916.

== Service ==
On commissioning, Gentian moved to Scapa Flow in Orkney, as one of the minesweepers attached to the Grand Fleet. As such, Gentian's duties were mainly confined to keeping the approaches to Scapa Flow used by the Grand Fleet clear of mines, with daily sweeping of the prescribed channels. On 30 May 1916, Gentian was 40 miles (64 km) east of the Pentland Skerries when she was missed by a torpedo, which was probably launched by the German submarine U-43, waiting to attack ships of the Grand Fleet, which fired a torpedo against several sloops in this region on that day. Destroyers and aircraft were ordered out from Scapa to hunt U-43, but although a submarine was sighted, U-43 escaped unharmed. By July 1916, the Grand Fleet's minesweepers had been split into three flotillas, with Gentian joining the 2nd Fleetsweeping Flotilla. Gentian was still part of the 2nd Minesweeper Flotilla attached to the Grand Fleet at the end of the war on 11 November 1918, but by December that year had transferred to the 1st Minesweeping Flotilla, still supporting the Grand Fleet.

Gentian was listed as still a member of the 1st Flotilla, but paid off, in March 1919, and in May 1919, she was listed as in reserve at the Firth of Forth with a nucleus crew.

=== Baltic operations ===
The British campaign in the Baltic was a part of the Allied intervention in the Russian Civil War. The codename of the Royal Navy campaign was "Operation Red Trek". The intervention played a key role in enabling the establishment of the independent states of Estonia and Latvia but failed to secure the control of Petrograd by White Russian forces, which was one of the main goals of the campaign. The task force was vital in supplying the Baltic states as well as containing the Soviet Navies.

On 26 June 1919, the 1st Fleet Sweeping Flotilla arrived at Biorko to reinforce the British forces in the Baltic. On 15 July, (Note: 15 July according to Dunn, 16 July according to Dittmar and Colledge, Gardiner and Gray, Kemp, and Gibson and Prendergast.) four sloops of the 1st Flotilla, Myrtle, Gentian, Lilac and Lupin, were employed sweeping mines east of Saaremaa. The sloops worked in pairs, towing a sweep between the two ships, which steamed about 500 yd (460 m) apart, with Myrtle working with Gentian. During the afternoon, Myrtle and Gentian were attempting to sink mines that had been brought to the surface by Lilac and Lupin's sweep when Gentian struck an unswept mine. Myrtle went to Gentian's assistance, but also stuck a mine, which broke off the fore part of the ship and killed six. Myrtle sank 90 minutes after striking the mine. Myrtle's commanding officer, Lieutenant Commander Richard Scott, was awarded the Bronze Albert Medal for Lifesaving for his actions during the sinking, returning alone to the ship to search it for a missing man. Gentian remained afloat, with the destroyer Wrestler and the Estonian tug Ebba arriving on 16 July to assist, but on the afternoon of 17 July, Gentian capsized and sank.

== Wreck ==
In July 2010 an Estonian Navy minesweeper located the wrecks of Gentian, Myrtle, and the light cruiser HMS Cassandra.

The wreck of the Gentian is at a depth of 51-60 meters. The bow of the ship is slightly detached from the rest of the hull and the wreck has a list to port in the north-south direction.

== Cited sources ==
- "3 British First World War-era ships found off Estonia". The Globe and Mail. 2 May 2018.
- Bennett, Geoffrey (2002). Freeing the Baltic. Edinburgh: Birlinn. ISBN 1-84341-001-X.
- Brown, D. K. (2010). The Grand Fleet: Warship Design and Development 1906–1922. Barnsley, UK: Seaforth Publishing. ISBN 978-1-84832-085-7.
- Campbell, John (1998). Jutland: An Analysis of the Fighting. London: Conway Maritime Press. ISBN 0-85177-750-3.
- Dittmar, F.J.; Colledge, J.J. (1972). British Warships 1914–1919. Shepperton, UK: Ian Allan. ISBN 0-7110-0380-7.
- Dorling, Taprell (1935). Swept Channels: Being an Account of the Work of the Minesweepers in the Great War. London: Hodder and Stoughton.
- Dunn, Steve (2020). Battle of the Baltic. Barnsley: Seaforth Publishing. ISBN 978-1-5267-4273-5.
- Gardiner, Robert; Gray, Randal, eds. (1985). Conway's All The World's Fighting Ships 1906–1921. London: Conway Maritime Press. ISBN 0-85177-245-5.
- Gibson, R. H.; Prendergast, Maurice (2002) [1931]. The German Submarine War 1914-1918. Penzance, UK: Periscope Publishing. ISBN 9781904381082.
- Hepper, David (2006). British Warship Losses in the Ironclad Era 1860–1919. London: Chatham Publishing. ISBN 9781861762733.
- Jellicoe, John (1919). The Grand Fleet 1914–16: Its Creation, Development and Work. London: Cassell and Company. OCLC 859842281.
- Kemp, Paul (1999). The Admiralty Regrets: British Warship Losses of the 20th Century. Stroud, UK: Sutton Publishing Limited. ISBN 0-7509-1567-6.
- Kinvig, Clifford (2006). Churchill's Crusade: The British Invasion of Russia, 1918-1920. A & C Black. ISBN 9781852854775.
- Langworth, Richard (23 April 2017). "Churchill and the Baltic, Part 1". Hillsdale College.
- Wainwright, Martin (23 August 2010). "British warships sunk 90 years ago found off Estonian coast". The Guardian.
- Wright, Damien (2017). Churchill's Secret War With Lenin: British and Commonwealth Military Intervention in the Russian Civil War, 1918-20. Helion and Company. ISBN 9781913118112.
