= HMS Zinnia (1915) =

Sloop of the Royal Navy

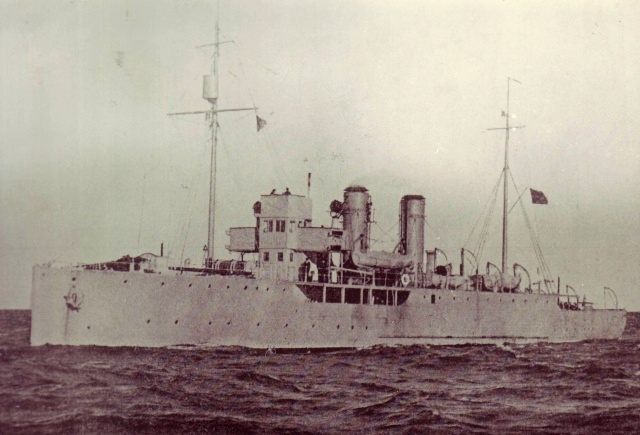
- HMS Zinnia in Belgium in 1920

History

United Kingdom
- Name: HMS Zinnia
- Builder: Swan Hunter
- Launched: 12 August 1915
- Completed: 25 September 1915
- Fate: Sold to Belgium 19 April 1920

Belgium
- Name: Zinnia
- Fate: Captured by Germany, 1940

Germany
- Name: Barbara
- Fate: Surrendered to Allies 1945

Belgium
- Name: Breydel
- Fate: Scrapped 1952

General characteristics
- Class & type: Azalea-class sloop
- Displacement: 1,210 long tons (1,230 t)
- Length: 262 ft 6 in (80.01 m) o/a
- Beam: 33 ft (10.06 m)
- Draught: 11 ft (3.35 m)
- Propulsion: 1 × triple expansion engine; 2 × cylindrical boilers; 1 × propeller
- Speed: 17.5 kn (32.4 km/h; 20.1 mph)
- Complement: 90
- Armament: 2 × QF 4.7-inch Mk IV guns and 2 × 1 - 3-pounders (47 mm) AA.

HMS Zinnia was an Azalea-class minesweeping sloop of the Royal Navy, built in 1915 at the Swan Hunter & Wigham Richardson yard, at Wallsend in the United Kingdom.It was sold to Belgium on 19 April 1920 to join their new Corps of Destroyers and Sailors.

== Design and construction ==
The Azalea class was based on the previous Acacia class, but with a heavier gun armament. (Note: Together with the following Arabis class, Aubrietia class and Anchusa class, these classes were collectively known as Flower-class sloops.) They were designed at the start of the First World War as relatively fast minesweepers that could also carry out various miscellaneous duties in support of the fleet such as acting as dispatch vessels or carrying out towing operations, but as the war continued and the threat from German submarines grew, became increasingly involved in anti-submarine duties.

Zinnia was 262 ft 6 in (80.01 m) long overall and 250 ft (76.20 m) between perpendiculars, with a beam of 33 ft (10.06 m) and a draught of 11 ft (3.35 m). Displacement was 1,210 long tons (1,230 t) normal. Two cylindrical boilers fed steam to a triple expansion steam engine rated at 1,800 ihp (1,300 kW), giving a speed of 16.5 kn (30.6 km/h; 19.0 mph). Zinnia had a main armament of two 4.7-inch (120 mm) guns, with two 3-pounder (47 mm) anti-aircraft guns also carried. She had a crew of 90 officers and other ranks.

Zinnia was ordered on 4 May 1915. She was built by Swan Hunter at their Wallsend shipyard and was launched on 12 August 1915, and was completed on 25 September 1915.

== Service ==
=== First World War ===
Following commissioning, Zinnia joined the First Sloop Flotilla, based at Queenstown (now Cobh). On 28 March 1916, Zinnia spotted the German submarine U-44 63 nautical miles (117 km; 72 mi) ESE of the Fastnet Rock, shooting twice at the submarine, which dived away unharmed, Zinnia's shells falling short. On 29 March, U-44 torpedoed the sloop Begonia, which did not sink. Zinnia and sister ship Snowdrop were ordered to go to Begonia's aid, and the damaged sloop was towed into Queenstown. On 20 April 1916, Zinnia came across the German submarine U-69, south-west of Ireland, just after U-69 had sunk the steamer Cairngowan, forcing the submarine to dive away, and dropped two depth charges, but U-69 was unharmed. On 23 October 1916, the sloop Genista was torpedoed and sunk by the submarine U-57 120 nmi (140 mi; 220 km) west of Cape Clear Island. Zinnia and Camellia were ordered out from Queenstown to pick up her survivors, but at first failed to find them, and were joined by the cruiser Adventure. Eventually, 12 survivors were picked up.

On 8 March 1917, Zinnia encountered a German submarine, possibly U-53, off Fastnet, and opened fire, claiming an apparent hit on the submarine. (Note: U-53, if it was the submarine involved, survived the encounter unharmed and continued her patrol.) On 28 March 1917, Zinnia was escorting the tanker Gasfa 15 nmi (17 mi; 28 km) out of Queenstown when the submarine U-57 torpedoed and sunk Gasfa. Zinnia retaliated with two depth charges, which the submarine's crew considered "uncomfortably close", but the submarine escaped. Seven of Gasfa's crew were killed in the attack, with the remainder rescued by Zinnia. On 3 May 1917, the German submarine U-62 torpedoed the British steamer Frederick Knight West of Ireland. Zinnia came to Frederick Knight's assistance, forcing the submarine to submerge, but could not stop the submarine torpedoing the merchant ship again, sinking Frederick Knight. The next day, U-62 stopped the Danish barque Jörgen Olsen, and attempted to sink the sailing vessel with gunfire. Zinnia again interrupted U-62, opening fire and forcing the submarine to submerge. Jörgen Olsen remained afloat and was towed into Berehaven. On 7 June 1917, the Q-ship Pargust was on patrol off the south coast of Ireland when she was torpedoed by the German submarine UC-29. Part of Pargust's crew abandoned ship as a "panic party", in order to tempt the submarine to surface, which UC-29 did after thirty minutes. Pargust then opened fire, sinking UC-29. Zinnia, the sloop Crocus and the American destroyer USS Cushing came to the assistance of Pargust which was kept afloat by her cargo of timber, with Crocus towing Pargust into Queenstown, with Zinnia and Cushing in escort. On 20 August 1917, Zinnia collided with the American destroyer Benham, badly damaging the American ship, which was towed into Queenstown by Zinnia.

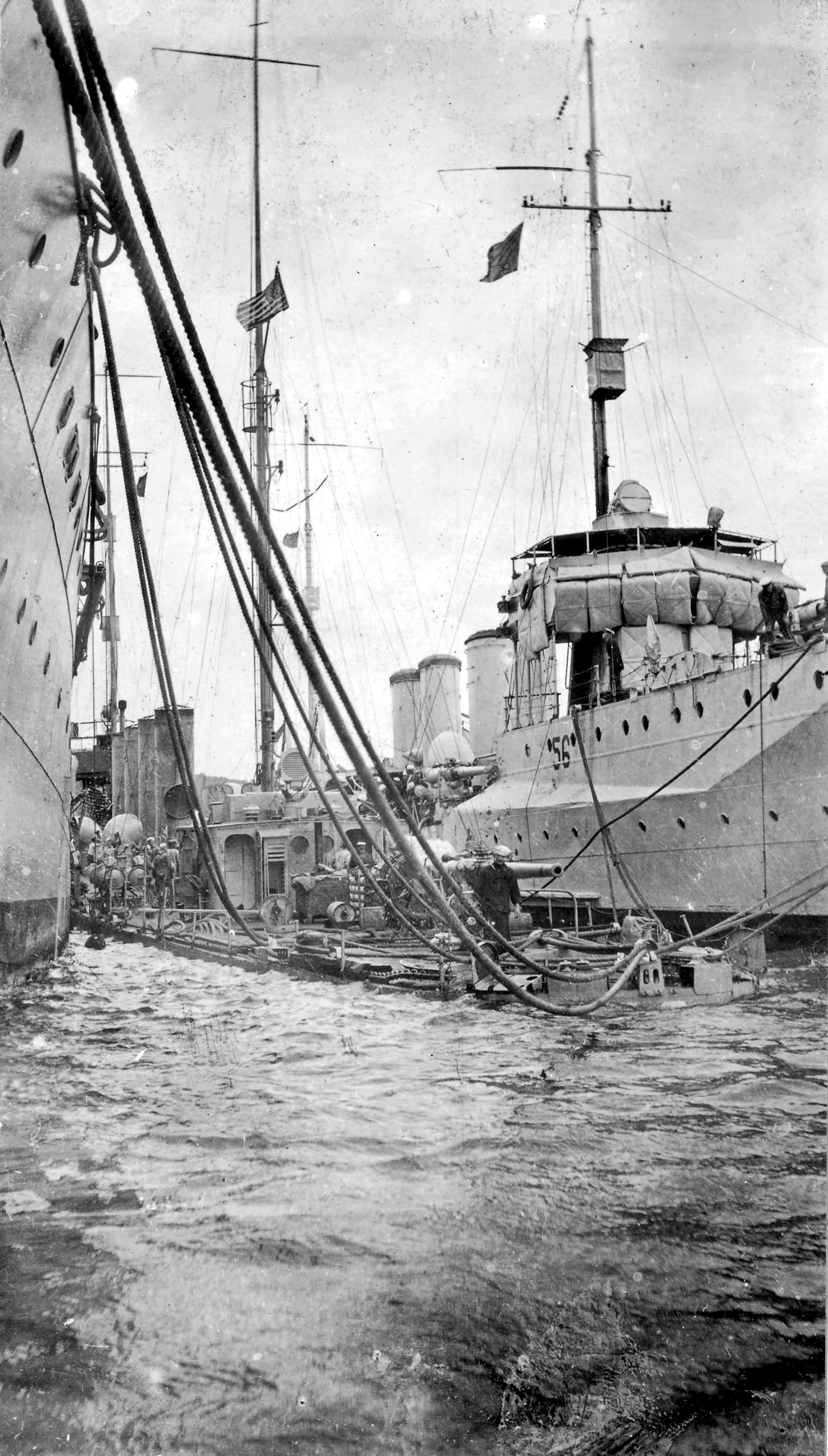
The partially submerged USS Benham after being rammed by HMS Zinnia

Zinnia remained part of the First Sloop Flotilla at the end of the war.

=== Belgium ===
On 19 April 1920, Belgium bought the Zinnia as a fishery protection vessel, acquiring her without armament, although by 1923 she was listed as carrying one 4.7 inch gun and three 12-pounder (76 mm) guns. Belgium disbanded its Navy as a military force in 1927, but Zinnia remained in use as a civilian-manned fishery protection vessel.

In May 1940, as Belgium fell to advancing German forces, the ship was seized by the German Army at the port of Ostend. She was reconstructed at the Antwerp shipyard of the Belgian shipbuilders Cockerill as an artillery training ship, with the forward well deck of the ship filled in to give a long forecastle that ran most of the length of the ship, an rebuilt superstructure and a new armament, and renamed Barbara. This armament consisted of a single 10.5 cm SK L/45 naval gun forward, and a heavy close-in anti-aircraft armament of one 3.7 cm SK C/30 gun and ten 2 cm guns. Barbara served with the Naval Anti-Aircraft and Coastal Artillery School from January 1942, and from June 1943, served with the Navy anti-aircraft school at the port of Swinemünde, in addition to acting as a support ship for a flotilla of R boats (motor minesweepers).

The ship was recaptured in October 1945 by the British, and was returned to Belgium at the port of Ostend by a crew of the Royal Navy Belgian Section. It was reassigned to the Belgian Navy and the 105 mm gun was removed.

In 1946, when the Belgian Navy was reformed, the ship was renamed Breydel and resumed its activity as a fishery protection vessel in 1947. Too dilapidated to carry out the new tasks of the Belgian Navy, it was retired in 1949 and scrapped in 1950.
