= HMS Snowdrop (1915) =

Minesweeper of the Royal Navy

History

United Kingdom
- Name: HMS Snowdrop
- Builder: McMillann
- Launched: 7 October 1915
- Decommissioned: 15 January 1923
- Fate: Sold for breaking up on 15 January 1923

General characteristics
- Class & type: Azalea-class sloop
- Displacement: 1,210 long tons (1,230 t)
- Length: 255 ft 3 in (77.80 m) p.p.; 267 ft 9 in (81.61 m) o/a
- Beam: 33 ft 6 in (10.21 m)
- Draught: 11 ft 9 in (3.58 m)
- Propulsion: 1 × 4-cylinder triple expansion engine; 2 × cylindrical boilers; 1 × propeller
- Speed: 17 knots (31 km/h; 20 mph)
- Range: 2,000 nmi (3,700 km; 2,300 mi) at 15 kn (28 km/h; 17 mph) with maximum load of fuel
- Capacity: 260 short tons (240 t) of coal (maximum)
- Complement: 79 men
- Armament: 2 × 1 - QF 4 inch Mk IV guns, BL 4 inch Mk IX guns or QF 4.7 inch Mk IV guns; 2 × 1 - 3-pounders (47 mm) AA

HMS Snowdrop was an Azalea-class sloop of the Royal Navy. She served during the First World War. Snowdrop survived the war and was sold for scrap in 1923. She also saved many of the RMS Carpathia's survivors.

== Design and construction ==
The Azalea class was based on the previous Acacia class, but with a heavier gun armament. (Note: Together with the following Arabis class, Aubrietia class and Anchusa class, these classes were collectively known as Flower-class sloops.) They were designed at the start of the First World War as relatively fast minesweepers that could also carry out various miscellaneous duties in support of the fleet such as acting as dispatch vessels or carrying out towing operations, but as the war continued and the threat from German submarines grew, became increasingly involved in anti-submarine duties.

Snowdrop was 262 ft 6 in (80.01 m) long overall and 250 ft (76.20 m) between perpendiculars, with a beam of 33 ft (10.06 m) and a draught of 11 ft (3.35 m). Displacement was 1,210 long tons (1,230 t) normal. Two cylindrical boilers fed steam to a triple expansion steam engine rated at 1,800 indicated horsepower (1,300 kW), giving a speed of 16.5 knots (30.6 km/h; 19.0 mph). The Azeleas had a main armament of two 4.7-inch (120 mm) or 4-inch (102 mm) guns, with two 3-pounder (47 mm) anti-aircraft guns also carried. Snowdrop had a crew of 90 officers and other ranks.

Snowdrop was ordered on 4 May 1915 from the Scottish shipbuilder Archibald McMillan & Son, and was built at their Dumbarton shipyard as Yard number 463. She was launched on 7 October 1915, and was completed on 3 December 1915.

== Career ==
Snowdrop joined the 1st Sloop Flotilla, operating under the Vice Admiral Commanding, Coast of Ireland, following commissioning. In March 1916, Snowdrop was employed on escort duties. On 29 March, the sloop Begonia was torpedoed by the German submarine U-44, and Snowdrop and sister ship Zinnia were ordered to go to Begonia's assistance. Begonia was towed to Queenstown (now Cobh). Following the outbreak of the Easter Rising against British rule in Ireland in April 1916, Snowdrop escorted a transport carrying troops to Galway on 30 April.

On 17 January 1917, Snowdrop and the sloop Myosotis were escorting the merchant ship SS Castalia when the German submarine U-57 fired a torpedo which narrowly missed Myosotis. Myosotis opened fire on U-57' s conning tower and the submarine dived away to safety. On 5 April 1917, the merchant ship SS Canadian, which had been torpedoed by U-60 the previous day, sank 25 nmi (29 mi; 46 km) west of Bantry Bay. Snowdrop rescued all but one of Canadian's crew. On 23 April, the German submarine U-50 attacked the steamer Dykland with a torpedo and gunfire. The British submarine H5 drove off U-50 and later that day, Snowdrop took Dykland under tow at a speed of only 1.5 knots (2.8 km/h; 1.7 mph), attempting to bring the damaged ship back to Bantry Bay. On 26 April, the tow parted, and the sloop Primrose took over the towing duties, but Dykland finally sank later that day, still 30 nmi (35 mi; 56 km) short of safety. On 16 October 1917, Snowdrop took the American destroyer USS Cassin in tow, after the Cassin had been torpedoed by U-61 the previous day.

On 17 July 1918, she rescued the survivors from the liner RMS Carpathia, which had been torpedoed three times and sunk by U-55 (six years earlier Carpathia had rescued the survivors from the ill-fated RMS Titanic). U-55 approached the survivors but was driven away by gunfire from the Snowdrop.

Snowdrop survived the war and continued in service until being sold for breaking up on 15 January 1923 to the Unity Ship Breaking Company.
