= HMS Alyssum (1915) =

1915 British ship

History

United Kingdom
- Name: HMS Alyssum
- Operator: Royal Navy
- Builder: Earle's Shipbuilding and Engineering Company, Kingston upon Hull
- Launched: 5 November 1915
- Fate: Mined 18 March 1917

General characteristics
- Type: Minesweeper
- Displacement: 1,200 long tons (1,200 t)
- Length: 267 ft 9 in (81.61 m) o/a
- Beam: 33 ft 6 in (10.21 m)
- Draught: 11 ft 0 in (3.35 m)
- Propulsion: 1 × 4-cylinder triple expansion engine; 2 × cylindrical boilers; 1 screw
- Speed: 17 knots (31 km/h; 20 mph)
- Complement: 79 men
- Armament: 2 4.7-inch guns and 2 × 3-pounder (47 mm) AA guns

HMS Alyssum was an Arabis-class minesweeping sloop of the British Royal Navy which served during the First World War. Alyssum was built in 1915 by Earle's Shipbuilding, and was used for minesweeping, escort and patrol duties in the North and Irish Seas. The sloop sank after hitting a German mine on 18 March 1917.

== Design and construction ==
The Arabis class was a slightly enlarged and improved derivative of the previous Acacia-class and Azalea-class sloops. (Note: Together with the following Aubrietia class and Anchusa class, these classes were collectively known as Flower-class sloops.) They were designed at the start of the First World War as relatively fast minesweepers that could also carry out various miscellaneous duties in support of the fleet such as acting as dispatch vessels or carrying out towing operations, but as the war continued and the threat from German submarines grew, became increasingly involved in anti-submarine duties.

Rosemary was 268 ft (81.69 m) long overall and 255 ft (77.72 m) between perpendiculars, with a beam of 33 ft 6 in (10.21 m) and a draught of 11 ft (3.35 m). Displacement was 1,200 long tons (1,200 t) normal. Two cylindrical boilers fed steam to a four-cylinder triple expansion steam engine rated at 2,000 ihp (1,500 kW), giving a speed of 16 knots (30 km/h; 18 mph). The Arabis class had a main armament of two 4.7-inch (120 mm) guns or two 4-inch (102 mm) guns, with two 3-pounder (47 mm) anti-aircraft guns also carried. The Arabis class had a main armament of two 4.7-inch (120 mm) guns or two 4-inch (102 mm) guns, with Alyssum armed with 4.7-inch guns, and two 3-pounder (47 mm) anti-aircraft guns also carried. The ship had a crew of 90 officers and other ranks.

Alyssum was one of the first batch of Arabis-class sloops ordered on 6 July 1915. Alyssum, the first Royal Navy ship of that name, was launched on 5 November 1915 at Earle's Shipbuilding's Kingston upon Hull shipyard, and was delivered to the Royal Navy on 17 December that year.

== Service ==
On commissioning, Alyssum joined the newly established 10th Sloop Flotilla, which consisted of Arabis-class sloops. On 9 February 1916, the four sloops of the flotilla (Buttercup (leader of the flotilla), Arabis, Alyssum and Poppy), set out from Bridlington Bay to continue sweeping a channel in the North Sea. On 10 February a force of 25 German torpedo boats of the 2nd, 6th and 9th Torpedo-boat flotillas set out on a sortie into the North Sea. While the British Admiralty had been warned of the German operation by the codebreakers of Room 40, they did not recall the 10th Sloop Flotilla in order not to warn the Germans that the British could break the German Navy's codes. (Note: The ships of the 10 Sloop Flotilla carried the GS code, which was not believed to be secure.) The Admiralty stated that "Vessels at a distance from their ports must take their chance". At dusk on 10 February, the four sloops stopped their sweeping, dropping a dan buoy to mark the progress of the sweep. Arabis was ordered to remain underway in the vicinity of the buoy, while the other three ships steamed south-east and north-west. Later that night, German torpedo boats attacked the sloops. At about 22:50 hr, Buttercup was leading Poppy and Alyssum back towards the buoy, when what appeared to be the flashes of torpedoes being launched were spotted by Buttercup's officer of the watch, who turned the sloop away at full speed with Poppy and Alyssum following. The three sloops managed to avoid torpedoes launched at them, and escaped, but Arabis remained near the buoy and was later torpedoed and sunk by other torpedo boats.

On the morning of 4 July 1916, the 10th Sloop Flotilla was carrying out sweeps of the routes to the German Bight used by the Grand Fleet. Alyssum and the sloop Rosemary were sweeping together, covered by Buttercup, while Gladiolus and Mignonette were covered by Poppy. At 9:25am, Alyssum sighted two torpedoes which she avoided, but Rosemary saw the torpedoes too late, and one of them, which had been fired by the German submarine U-63, hit Rosemary, blowing off the sloop's stern. Alyssum took Rosemary under tow by Alyssum, with the rest of the flotilla escorting the two sloops back to the Humber. Three of Rosemary's crew were killed.

In February 1917, as a result of the German resumption of unrestricted submarine warfare, and the resulting heavy shipping losses in the Western Approaches, Alyssum, together with the rest of the 10th Sloop Flotilla, was transferred to Queenstown (now Cobh) in the South of Ireland, to be deployed on escort duties. On 22 February, Alyssum was escorting SS Canadian when the sloop was ordered to leave Canadian and join the Q-ship Penshurst, which had spotted the German submarine U-84, and after luring the submarine to the surface by having a "panic party" abandon ship, fired at U-84, hitting the submarine several times and dropped depth charges when the submarine submerged. U-84 resurfaced and used the submarine's superior speed to draw away from Penshurt. When Alyssum spotted the submarine, it set off in pursuit, although the sloop was little faster than the submarine and could only close slowly. Alyssum exchanged long range gunfire with the submarine, whose guns outranged the 4.7 inch guns of the sloop, before the sloop lost sight of the submarine as night fell. U-84 had been badly damaged by Penhurst, but managed to return to Germany. On 11 March 1917, Alyssum was patrolling in St George's Channel when she was missed by two torpedoes, probably fired by U-53.

On 18 March 1917, Alyssum, together with the sloop Myosotis was sweeping a minefield laid by the German submarine UC-66 off Galley Head, County Cork, when she struck a mine which exploded under the ship's bridge. Alyssum was taken in tow by the stern, first by Myosotis and then by a tug, but after about an hour, the sloop sank. The same minefield had sunk the sloop Mignonette the day before.
