= HMS Arabis (1915) =

Minesweeper of the Royal Navy

History

United Kingdom
- Name: HMS Arabis
- Builder: D. and W. Henderson and Company, Glasgow
- Launched: 6 November 1915
- Fate: Sunk, 10 February 1916

General characteristics
- Class & type: Arabis-class sloop
- Displacement: 1,200 long tons (1,200 t)
- Length: 255 ft 3 in (77.80 m) p.p.; 267 ft 9 in (81.61 m) o/a
- Beam: 33 ft 6 in (10.21 m)
- Draught: 11 ft 9 in (3.58 m)
- Propulsion: 1 × 4-cylinder triple expansion steam engine; 2 × cylindrical boilers; 1 × screw
- Speed: 17 knots (31 km/h; 20 mph)
- Range: 2,000 nmi (3,700 km; 2,300 mi) at 15 knots (28 km/h; 17 mph) with max. 260 tons of coal
- Complement: 79
- Armament: 2 × QF 4.7-inch Mk IV guns; 2 × 1 - 3-pounder (47 mm) AA guns

HMS Arabis was an Arabis-class sloop of the Royal Navy. She had a brief career, serving during the First World War.

She was built by D. and W. Henderson and Company, of Glasgow as Yard No 497, and was launched on 6 November 1915. She was involved in a minesweeping exercise off the Dogger Bank during the night of 10 February 1916, when she was encountered by a flotilla of German torpedo boats. A brief action followed which led to the torpedoing and sinking of Arabis with the loss of 56 of her crew.

== Design ==
The Arabis class was a slightly enlarged and improved derivative of the previous Acacia-class and Azalea-class sloops. (Note: Together with the following Aubrietia class and Anchusa class, these classes were collectively known as Flower-class sloops.) They were designed at the start of the First World War as relatively fast minesweepers that could also carry out various miscellaneous duties in support of the fleet such as acting as dispatch vessels or carrying out towing operations, but as the war continued and the threat from German submarines grew, became increasingly involved in anti-submarine duties.

Arabis was 268 ft (81.69 m) long overall and 255 ft (77.72 m) between perpendiculars, with a beam of 33 ft 6 in (10.21 m) and a draught of 11 ft (3.35 m). Displacement was 1,200 long tons (1,200 t) normal. Two cylindrical boilers fed steam to a four-cylinder triple expansion steam engine rated at 2,000 ihp (1,500 kW), giving a speed of 16 knots (30 km/h; 18 mph). The Arabis class had a main armament of two 4.7-inch (120 mm) guns or two 4-inch (102 mm) guns, with Arabis armed with 4.7-inch guns, with two 3-pounder (47 mm) anti-aircraft guns also carried. The ship had a crew of 90 officers and other ranks.

== Construction and service ==
Arabis was one of the first nine ships of her class ordered on 6 July 1915. Arabis was laid down as yard number 497 at D. and W. Henderson and Company's Glasgow shipyard, and was launched on 6 November 1915. She was delivered to the Royal Navy on 18 December 1915, and was allocated the pennant number T44. Arabis joined the newly established 10th Sloop Flotilla, consisting of Arabis-class sloops, on commissioning.

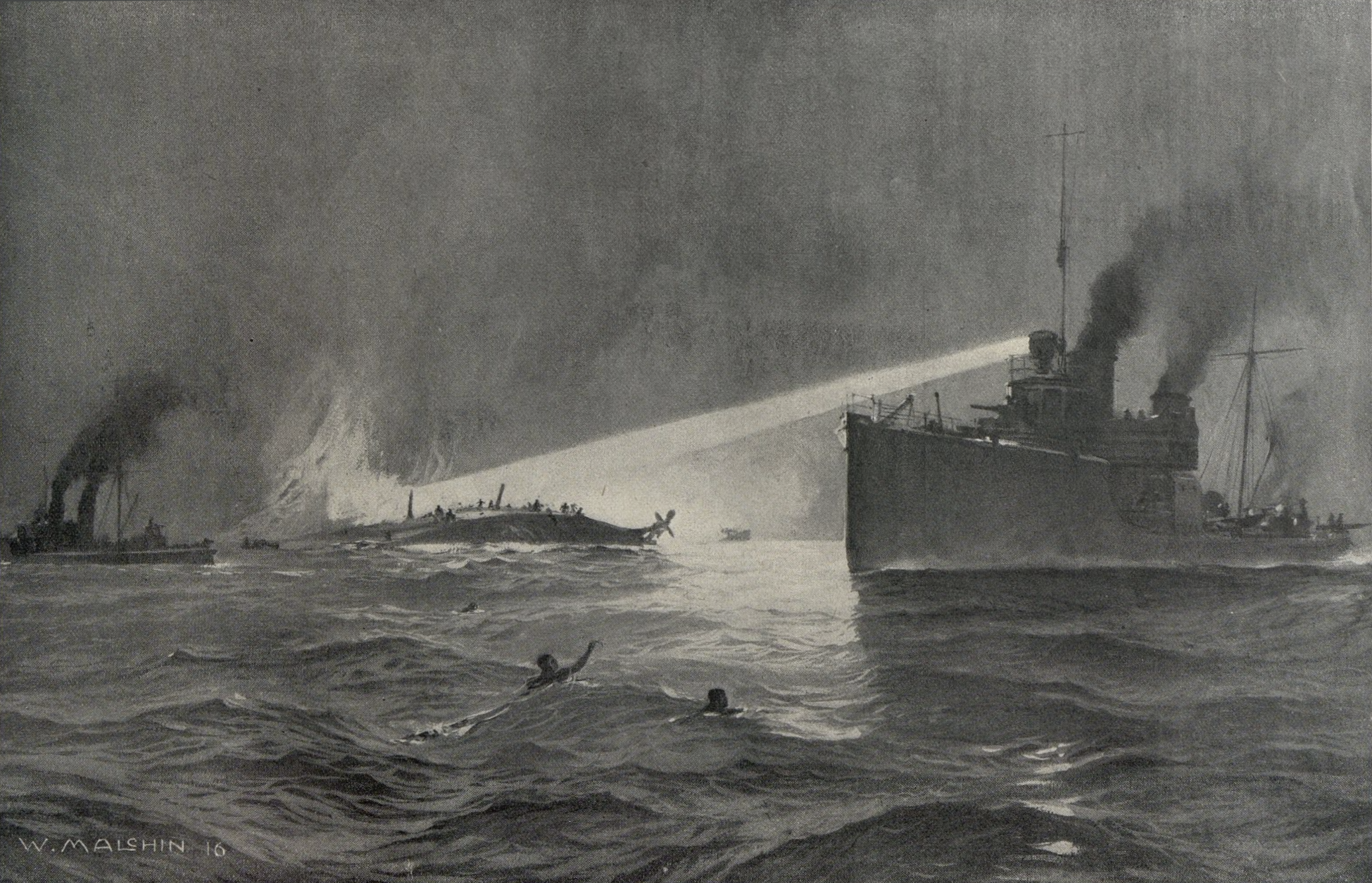
The sinking of the HMS Arabis

On 9 February 1916, the four sloops of the flotilla (Buttercup (leader of the flotilla), Arabis, Alyssum and Poppy), set out from Bridlington Bay to continue sweeping a channel in the North Sea. On 10 February a force of 25 German torpedo boats of the 2nd, 6th and 9th Torpedo-boat flotillas set out on a sortie into the North Sea. While the British Admiralty had been warned of the German operation by the codebreakers of Room 40, they did not recall the 10th Sloop Flotilla in order not to warn the Germans that the British could break the German Navy's codes. (Note: The ships of the 10 Sloop Flotilla carried the GS code, which was not believed to be secure.) The Admiralty stated that "Vessels at a distance from their ports must take their chance". At dusk on 10 February, the four sloops stopped their sweeping, dropping a dan buoy to mark the progress of the sweep. Arabis was ordered to remain underway in the vicinity of the buoy, while the other three ships steamed south-east and north-west. At about 22:50 hr, Buttercup was leading Poppy and Alyssum back towards the buoy, when what appeared to be the flashes of torpedoes being launched were spotted by Buttercup's officer of the watch, who turned the sloop away at full speed with Poppy and Alyssum following. Arabis, meanwhile, remained near the buoy and was attacked by several torpedo boats, with two torpedoes missing Arabis and an exchange of gunfire occurring, with Arabis's steering gear and radio equipment damaged before the German ships broke off the engagement. After about 45 minutes, a second group of German torpedo boats approached. Arabis opened fire on the German ships, although her aft 4.7-inch gun jammed after the second round, before two torpedoes hit Arabis, sinking the sloop. The Germans picked up 14 survivors, with 76 men killed. Arabis's commanding officer, Lieutenant-Commander Hallowell-Carew, was in 1919 awarded the Distinguished Service Order for this action.
