= HMS Cassandra (1916) =

Royal Navy C-class light cruiser

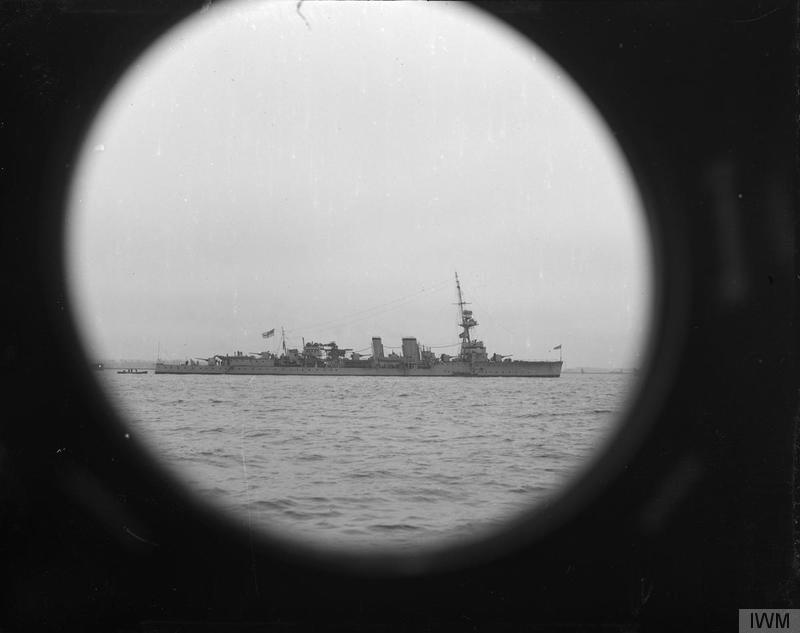
- HMS Cassandra in Copenhagen

History

United Kingdom
- Name: HMS Cassandra
- Builder: Vickers Limited, Barrow in Furness
- Laid down: March 1916
- Launched: 25 November 1916
- Commissioned: June 1917
- Identification: Pennant number: 3C (Jun 17);32 (Jan 18); 04 (Apr 18);
- Fate: Sunk on 5 December 1918 by mine near Saaremaa (Oesel) isle

General characteristics
- Class & type: C-class light cruiser
- Displacement: 4,190 tons
- Length: 450 ft (140 m)
- Beam: 43.6 ft (13.3 m)
- Draught: 14 ft (4.3 m)
- Installed power: 6 Yarrow boilers; 40,000 shp (30,000 kW)
- Propulsion: 2 shafts, 2 geared steam turbines
- Speed: 29 knots (54 km/h; 33 mph)
- Complement: 327
- Armament: 5 × single 6 in (152 mm) guns; 2 × single 3 in (76 mm) AA guns; 2 × single 2 pdr (40 mm (1.6 in)) AA guns; 4 × twin 21 in (533 mm) torpedo tubes
- Armour: 3 inch side (amidships); 2¼-1½ inch side (bows); 2 inch side (stern); 1 inch upper decks (amidships); 1 inch deck over rudder

HMS Cassandra was a C-class light cruiser of the Royal Navy. She was part of the Caledon group of the C class of cruisers. Cassandra had a short career, being commissioned in June 1917 and sunk by a mine during the British intervention in the Russian Civil War on 5 December 1918.

She was built by Vickers Limited, Barrow in Furness and laid down in March 1916, launched on 25 November 1916 and commissioned into the Navy in June 1917.

== Design and construction ==
The Caledon sub-class was a slightly larger and improved version of the preceding Centaur sub-class with a more powerful armament. The ships were 450 feet (137.2 m) long overall, with a beam of 42 feet 9 inches (13.0 m) and a deep draught of 16 feet 3 inches (5.0 m). Displacement was 4,120 long tons (4,190 t) at normal and 4,950 long tons (5,030 t) at deep load. Cassandra was powered by two sets of Parsons geared steam turbines, each driving one propeller shaft, which produced a total of 40,000 shaft horsepower (30,000 kW). The turbines used steam generated by six Yarrow boilers which gave her a speed of about 29 knots (54 km/h; 33 mph). She carried 935 long tons (950 t) tons of fuel oil. The ship had a crew of about 400 officers and ratings; this increased to 437 when serving as a flagship.

The main armament of the Caledon-class ships consisted of five BL 6-inch (152 mm) Mk XII guns that were mounted on the centreline. One gun was forward of the bridge, two were fore and aft of the two funnels and the last two were in the stern, with one gun superfiring over the rearmost gun. The two QF 3-inch (76 mm) 20 cwt anti-aircraft guns were positioned abreast of the fore funnel. The torpedo armament of the Caledons was eight 21 in (533 mm) torpedo tubes in four twin mounts, two on each broadside. Cassandra was fitted with a flying-off deck and hangar for a fighter aircraft to counter German Zeppelins after August 1917.

Cassandra was laid down at the Barrow-in-Furness shipyard of Vickers in March 1916, was launched on 25 November that year and was completed in June 1917.

== Service ==
Cassandra initially joined the 6th Light Cruiser Squadron of the Grand Fleet. She suffered a mishap when she and sister ship Caradoc ran aground on Fair Isle on 15 August 1917 but both ships were successfully salvaged. In October 1917, Cassandra formed part of a large-scale operation, involving 30 cruisers and 54 destroyers, deployed in eight groups across the North Sea in an attempt to stop a suspected sortie by German naval forces in the North Sea. The 6th Light Cruiser Squadron, including Cassandra, was tasked with patrolling off the Horns Reef. Despite these countermeasures, the two German light cruisers Bremse and Brummer managed to evade the patrols, which were deployed expecting German action further to the south, and attacked the regular convoy between Norway and Britain, sinking nine merchant ships and two destroyers, Mary Rose and Strongbow before returning safely to Germany.

Following the end of the First World War, the 6th Light Cruiser Squadron, including Cassandra, formed part of a force sent to the Baltic under the command of Rear-Admiral Edwyn Alexander-Sinclair to support the independence of the newly founded Baltic States against the Bolsheviks. On 5 December 1918 Alexander-Sinclair's force was on passage to Tallinn, threatened by a Bolshevik army, when Cassandra struck a mine, part of an uncharted German minefield, near Saaremaa in the Gulf of Finland. Cassandra quickly sank, but most of her crew were rescued by the destroyers Westminster and Vendetta with only eleven of her crew lost. (Ten were killed by the initial explosion while one man fell overboard during the rescue attempt).

== Rediscovery ==
The Estonian Navy and Estonian Maritime Museum announced in August 2010 that they had located the wrecks of Cassandra, the Arabis-class sloop HMS Gentian, and the Azalea-class HMS Myrtle near Saaremaa in depths of 197 to 328 feet (60 to 100 m). In 2021 the hydrographic research ship HMS Echo visited the location of the wreck and made multibeam images of the wreck. The bow is crushed and bent up until the bridge from the impact with the sea floor. The wreck lies at 96-97 meters on her starboard side and is considered to be in good condition. The wreck of HMS Cassandra is leaking oil and is considered to be an environmentally dangerous wreck.
