= HMS Bluebell (1915) =

Corvette, flower class

History

United Kingdom
- Name: HMS Bluebell
- Builder: Scotts Shipbuilding & Engineering Company, Greenock
- Launched: 24 July 1915
- Fate: Sold on 26 May 1930

General characteristics
- Class & type: Acacia-class minesweeping sloop
- Displacement: 1,200 tons
- Length: 250 ft (76 m) p/p; 262 ft 6 in (80.01 m) o/a
- Beam: 33 ft (10 m)
- Draught: 12 ft (3.7 m)
- Propulsion: 1 × 4-cylinder triple expansion engine; 2 × cylindrical boilers; 1 screw
- Speed: Designed for 1,400 or 1,800 hp to make 17 knots (31 km/h; 20 mph), but actually required about 2200 I.H.P. for this speed
- Range: 2,000 nmi (3,700 km) at 15 kn (28 km/h)
- Complement: 77 men
- Armament: Designed to mount 2 × 12-pounder (76 mm) guns and 2 × 3-pounder (47 mm) AA guns, but with wide variations

HMS Bluebell was an Acacia-class minesweeping sloop of the Royal Navy launched on 24 July 1915.

The merchant vessel SS Libau (masquerading under the name Aud) was intercepted by Bluebell as she carried arms to Ireland for the Easter Rising in 1916.

== Fate ==
She was sold in May 1930.

== Bibliography ==
- Colledge, J. J.; Warlow, Ben (2006) [1969]. Ships of the Royal Navy: The Complete Record of All Fighting Ships of the Royal Navy from the 15th Century to the Present (3rd Rev ed.). London: Chatham Publishing. ISBN 978-1-86176-281-8. OCLC 67375475.
- Gardiner, Robert & Gray, Randal, eds. (1985). Conway's All The World's Fighting Ships 1906–1921. London: Conway Maritime Press. ISBN 0-85177-245-5.
