= HMS Godetia (1916) =

Minesweeper of the Royal Navy

History

United Kingdom
- Name: HMS Godetia
- Launched: 8 January 1916
- Fate: Broken up, 1937

General characteristics
- Class & type: Arabis-class sloop
- Displacement: 1,200 long tons (1,200 t)
- Length: 255 ft 3 in (77.80 m) p.p.; 267 ft 9 in (81.61 m) o/a
- Beam: 33 ft 6 in (10.21 m)
- Draught: 11 ft 9 in (3.58 m)
- Propulsion: 1 × 4-cylinder triple expansion steam engine; 2 × cylindrical boilers; 1 × screw
- Speed: 17 knots (31 km/h; 20 mph)
- Range: 2,000 nmi (3,700 km; 2,300 mi) at 15 kn (28 km/h; 17 mph) with max. 260 tons of coal
- Complement: 79
- Armament: 2 × 1 - QF 4 inch Mk IV guns, BL 4 inch Mk IX guns or QF 4.7 inch Mk IV guns; 2 × 1 - 3-pounder (47 mm) AA guns

HMS Godetia was an Arabis-class sloop of the Royal Navy Fishery Protection Squadron. She was launched in 1916, had a deep load displacement of 1,350 tons, and was broken up in 1937.

For a short while she served in the Arctic, and on 9 May 1923 a trawler from Hull – the Lord Astor – was seized by a Russian gunboat off the coast of Murmansk for alleged illegal fishing. The trawler was captured after Godetia returned briefly to Norway to re-coal and resupply. The Godetia was soon relieved by HMS Harebell under Captain Evans, commander of the fishery protection cruiser squadron.
