= HMS Aubrietia =

Two ships of the Royal Navy have been named HMS Aubrietia:

- HMS Aubrietia (1916) was an Aubrietia-class sloop launched in 1916 and sold in 1922
- HMS Aubrietia (K96) was a Flower-class corvette, launched in 1940 and sold in 1946
