= HMIS Cornwallis =

History

United Kingdom
- Name: Lychnis
- Ordered: December 1916
- Builder: William Hamilton and Company
- Launched: 21 August 1917
- Commissioned: 1917
- Out of service: 1921
- Fate: Transferred to the Royal Indian Marine

British India
- Name: Cornwallis
- Acquired: 1921 (transferred from the Royal Navy)
- Out of service: 1946
- Fate: Scrapped 1946

General characteristics
- Class & type: Aubrietia-class sloop
- Displacement: 1,250 tons
- Length: 255 ft 3 in (77.80 m) p/p; 267 ft 9 in (81.61 m) o/a
- Beam: 33 ft 6 in (10.21 m)
- Draught: 12 ft 6 in (3.81 m)
- Propulsion: 1 × 4-cylinder triple expansion engine; 2 × cylindrical boilers; 1 screw
- Speed: Designed for 17.5 knots (32.4 km/h) at 2,500 ihp (1,900 kW), but actually made 15-16.5 knots with this power. Required 3,000 ihp (2,200 kW) for 17.5 knots (32.4 km/h).
- Range: 205 tons of coal
- Complement: 80 men
- Armament: Designed to mount 3 × 12-pounder guns and 2 × 3-pounder AA, but had 2 × 4 inch gun, 1 × 3-pounder AA and depth charge throwers

HMIS Cornwallis (L09) was an Aubrietia-class sloop, originally built during World War I and commissioned as HMS Lychnis in the Royal Navy (RN) in 1917. She was transferred to the Royal Indian Marine (RIM) and commissioned as Cornwallis in 1921.

She served during World War II in the Royal Indian Navy (RIN), the successor to the RIM. Her pennant number was changed to U09 in 1940. Although originally built as a minesweeper, she was primarily used as a convoy escort during the war. She was scrapped soon after the end of the war.

== History ==
HMS Lychnis was ordered in December 1916 as a part of the Emergency War Programme of World War I from William Hamilton and Company, Port Glasgow and was launched on 21 August 1917. She commissioned in 1917. She is credited with sinking the German submarine SM U-64 by depth charging and shelling on 17 June 1918 in the Mediterranean Sea.

Following the end of the war, she was transferred to the Royal Indian Marine and commissioned as HMIS Cornwallis. In 1934, RIM was renamed Royal Indian Navy. During World War II, she was a part of the Eastern Fleet. She escorted numerous convoys in the Indian Ocean 1942-45.

She was decommissioned and scrapped in 1946, soon after the end of the war.
