= HMS E32 =

British E class submarine

History

United Kingdom
- Name: E32
- Builder: J. Samuel White, East Cowes
- Launched: 16 August 1916
- Commissioned: October 1916
- Fate: Sold, 6 September 1922

General characteristics
- Class & type: E-class submarine
- Displacement: 662 long tons (673 t) surfaced; 807 long tons (820 t) submerged
- Length: 181 ft (55 m)
- Beam: 15 ft (4.6 m)
- Propulsion: 2 × 800 hp (597 kW) diesel; 2 × 420 hp (313 kW) electric; 2 screws
- Speed: 15 knots (28 km/h; 17 mph) surfaced; 10 knots (19 km/h; 12 mph) submerged
- Range: 3,000 nmi (5,600 km) at 10 kn (19 km/h; 12 mph) surfaced; 65 nmi (120 km) at 5 kn (9.3 km/h; 5.8 mph) surfaced
- Complement: 31
- Armament: 5 × 18 inch (450 mm) torpedo tubes (2 bow, 2 beam, 1 stern); 1 × 12-pounder gun

HMS E32 was a British E-class submarine built by J. Samuel White, Cowes, Isle of Wight. She was launched on 16 August 1916 and commissioned in October 1916. HMS E32 was sold in Sunderland on 6 September 1922.

== Design ==
Like all post-E8 British E-class submarines, E32 had a displacement of 662 long tons (673 t) at the surface and 807 long tons (820 t) while submerged. She had a total length of 180 feet (55 m) and a beam of 22 feet 8.5 inches (6.922 m). She was powered by two 800 horsepower (600 kW) Vickers eight-cylinder two-stroke diesel engines and two 420 horsepower (310 kW) electric motors. The submarine had a maximum surface speed of 16 knots (30 km/h; 18 mph) and a submerged speed of 10 knots (19 km/h; 12 mph). British E-class submarines had fuel capacities of 50 long tons (51 t) of diesel and ranges of 3,255 miles (5,238 km; 2,829 nmi) when travelling at 10 knots (19 km/h; 12 mph). E32 was capable of operating submerged for five hours when travelling at 5 knots (9.3 km/h; 5.8 mph).

E32 was armed with a 12-pounder 76 mm (3.0 in) QF gun mounted forward of the conning tower. She had five 18 inch (450 mm) torpedo tubes, two in the bow, one either side amidships, and one in the stern; a total of 10 torpedoes were carried.

E-Class submarines had wireless systems with 1 kilowatt (1.3 hp) power ratings; in some submarines, these were later upgraded to 3 kilowatts (4.0 hp) systems by removing a midship torpedo tube. Their maximum design depth was 100 feet (30 m) although in service some reached depths of below 200 feet (61 m). Some submarines contained Fessenden oscillator systems.

== Crew ==
Her complement was three officers and 28 men.

== Service ==
E32 was built by J. Samuel White at their Cowes, Isle of Wight shipyard. She was launched on 16 August 1916 and completed in October 1916.

In November 1916, E32 was listed as a member of the Ninth Submarine Flotilla, part of the Harwich Force. In February 1917, E32 was one of for submarines that deployed with the depot ship Vulcan for anti-U-boat patrols off Eagle Island. Patrols in the Irish Sea continued, with E32 spotting a German submarine on 8 March, but the German submarine escaped on the surface, outpacing E32. On 5 April 1917, E32 was operating with the decoy ship Q.13 (the sloop Aubrietia), when the merchant ship Benheather was torpedoed by the German submarine U-46, but did not immediately sink. E32 waited by the still floating wreck of Benheather for U-46 to approach, and when the German submarine closed, fired three torpedoes, which missed.

== Bibliography ==
- Hutchinson, Robert (2001). Jane's Submarines: War Beneath the Waves from 1776 to the Present Day. London: HarperCollins. ISBN 978-0-00-710558-8. OCLC 53783010.
- Monograph No. 34: Home Waters Part VIII: December 1916 to April 1917 (PDF). Naval Staff Monographs (Historical). Vol. XVIII. Naval Staff, Training and Staff Duties Division. 1933.
