= Blyth Shipbuilding Company =

Former shipyard in Northumberland, England

Blyth Shipbuilding & Dry Docks Company Ltd.
- Company type: Limited company
- Industry: Shipbuilding
- Founded: 2 March 1883
- Defunct: 1967
- Fate: Dissolved
- Headquarters: Blyth, Northumberland, England

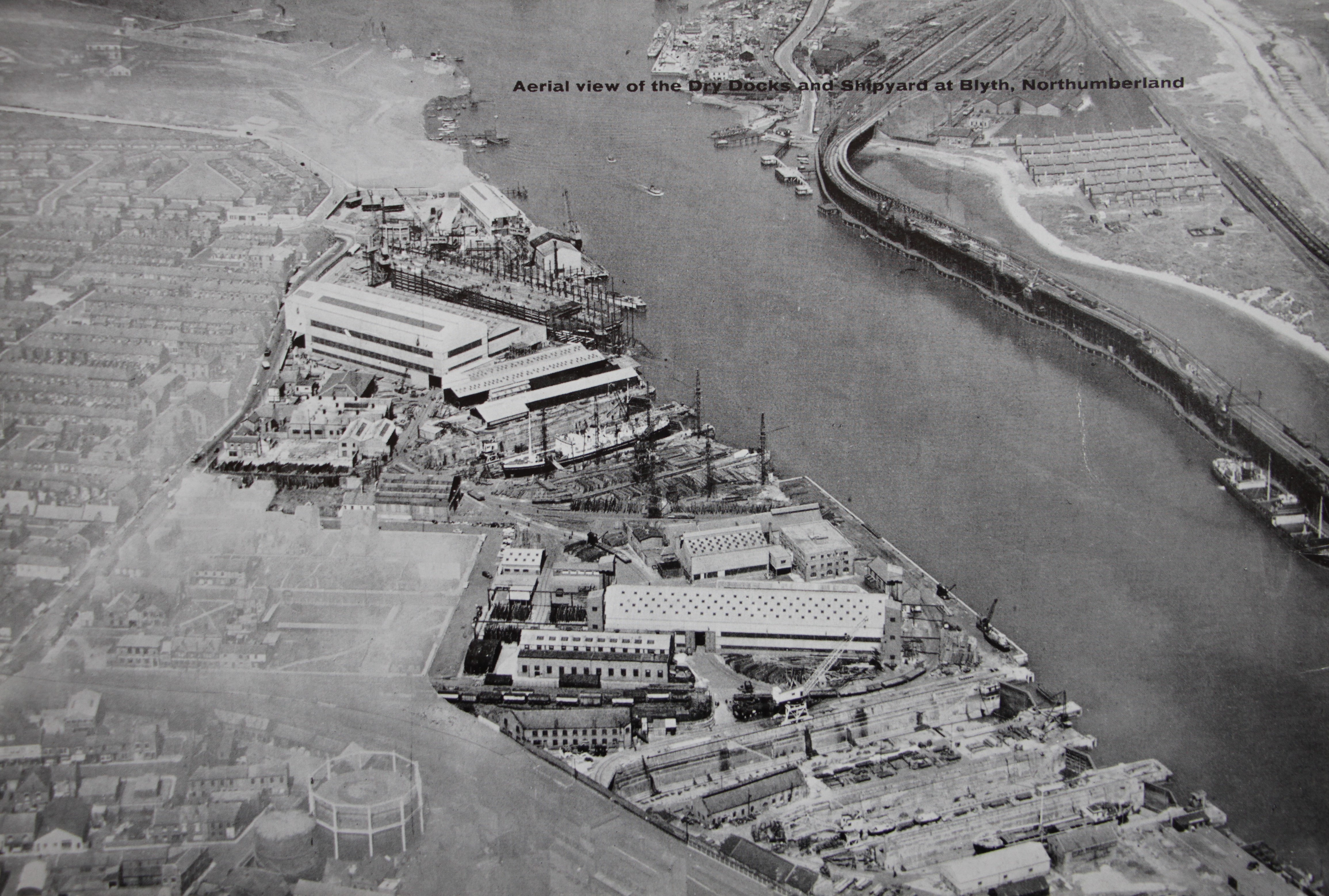
Aerial view of Blyth Dry Docks and Shipbuilding Co site at Blyth.

The Blyth Shipbuilding & Dry Docks Company Ltd. was a British shipyard located in Blyth, Northumberland, England.

== Company history ==
=== Early history ===
Shipbuilding began on the site on the south bank of the River Blyth in 1811. In the 1840s the yard was purchased by Beaumont and Drummond. In 1863 the yard was taken over by Hodgson and Soulsby who repaired and built small wooden sailing ships.

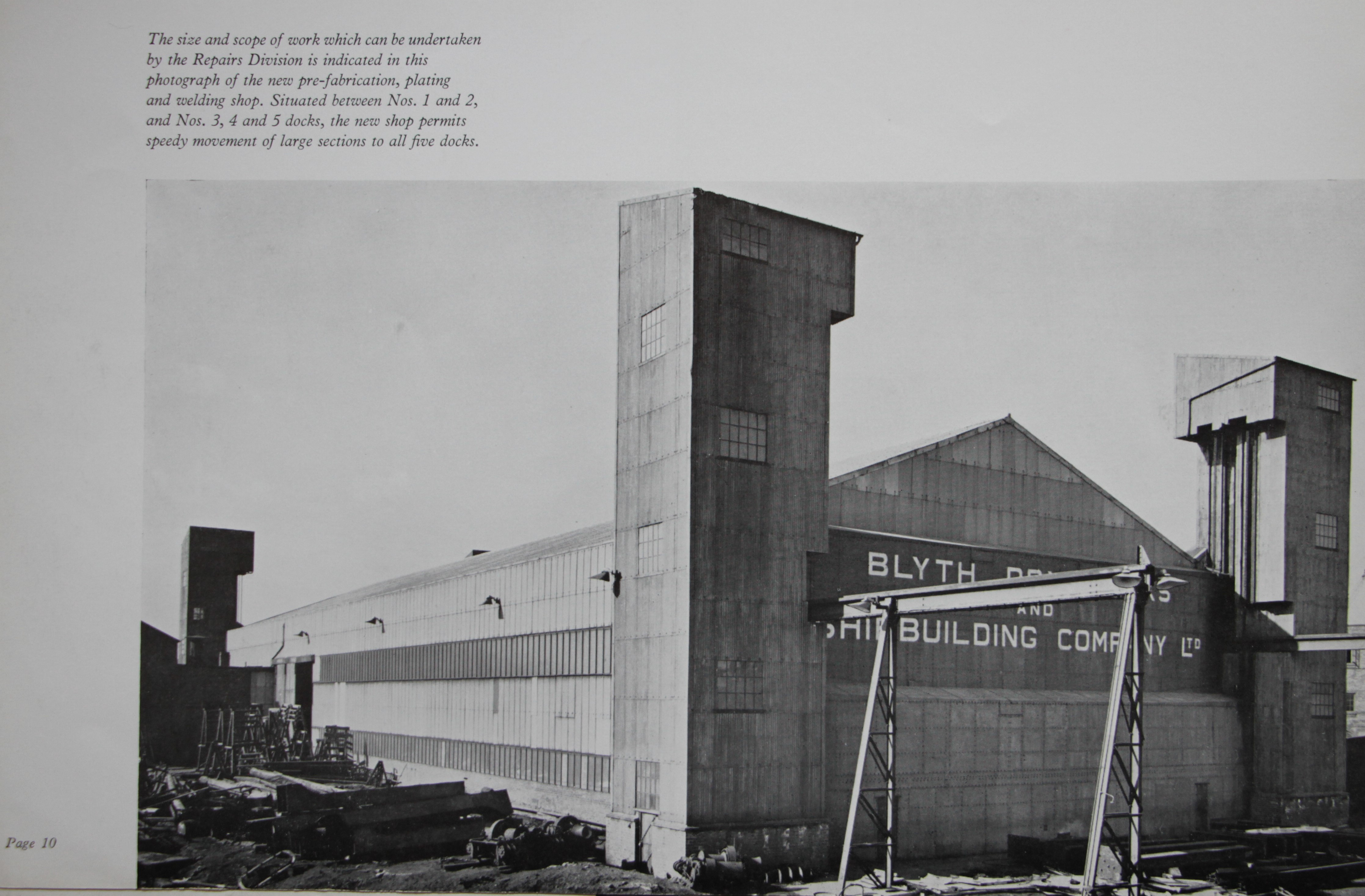
Prefabrication, plating and welding shop. Situated between docks 1,2 and docks 3,4,5.

=== Foundation ===
On 2 March 1883 the Blyth Shipbuilding & Dry Docks Company Ltd. was registered as a limited liability company. It built cargo liners, tramp steamers and colliers. The fifth ship built at the yard was for the shipping company Stephens and Mawson of Newcastle. Daniel Stephens eventually became a Director, and then the Chairman of the company.

=== World War I ===
In 1914 a cargo ship under construction was purchased by the Admiralty and converted into the Navy's first seaplane carrier Ark Royal. During the war the company completed nine tramps and colliers, along with ten X-lighter landing craft and six sloops for the Royal Navy; these were the Arabis-class minesweeper Verbena, the Aubrietia-class convoy escorts Aubrietia and Gaillardia, the Anchusa-class convoy escort Ivy and the 24-class fleet minesweepers Merry Hampton and Ormonde.

=== Reopening and World War II ===
In mid-1937 the yard was reopened under its original name. During World War II the Blyth company built five River class and two Bay-class frigates, seven Castle-class corvettes, as well as two Flower-class corvettes and ten Bangor-class minesweepers. The former German cargo ship Hannover was also converted into the escort carrier Audacity. Hansard records on 8 December 1943 that a question was put to the First Lord of the Admiralty that a director of Blyth Shipyard and an Admiralty official, was convicted of fraudulently altering a tender to the extent of £12,000 enabling the shipyard to secure a contract.

=== Decline and final closure ===
Unfortunately rising costs and falling orders meant that, after losing money for five years, the yard was finally closed in 1967. Repair work and shipbreaking was then carried out by various companies on the site.

=== Shipping owners commissioning new tonnage ===
List representing some of the owners commissioning new tonnage -

Admiralty, Ampol Petroleum, Barberrys Steamship Co Ltd, Bulk Oil Steamship Co Ltd, Commonwealth of Australia, Companhia de Navegacao, Corporation of Trinity House, Wm. Cory & Son ltd, Dalhousie Steam & Motor Ship Co Ltd, Eagle Oil & Shipping Co Ltd, Elder Dempster Co Ltd, J & C Harrison Ltd, J Ludwig Mowinckel's Rederi A/S, A.P. Moller, Nomikos Ltd, Olsen & Ugelstad, Pacific Steam Navigation Co, Polish Ocean Lines, Rederi A/B Helsingborg, The St Denis Shipping Co Ltd, Stephenson Clarke Ltd, Straits Steamship Co Ltd, Trader Line Ltd, Vilhelm Torkildsen and Wahl & Co.

=== Facilities ===
Dry Docks

1. 376 ft by 52 ft
2. 314 ft 8 ins by 50 ft 6 ins
3. 467 ft 10 ins by 60 ft
4. 338 ft 9 ins by 44 ft 10 ins
5. 311 ft by 46 ft

Building Berths

1. 350 ft by 50 ft
2. 370 ft by 54 ft
3. 694 ft 9 ins by 95 ft
4. 566 ft by 90 ft
