= Flower-class sloop =

1915 class of Royal Navy sloops-of-war

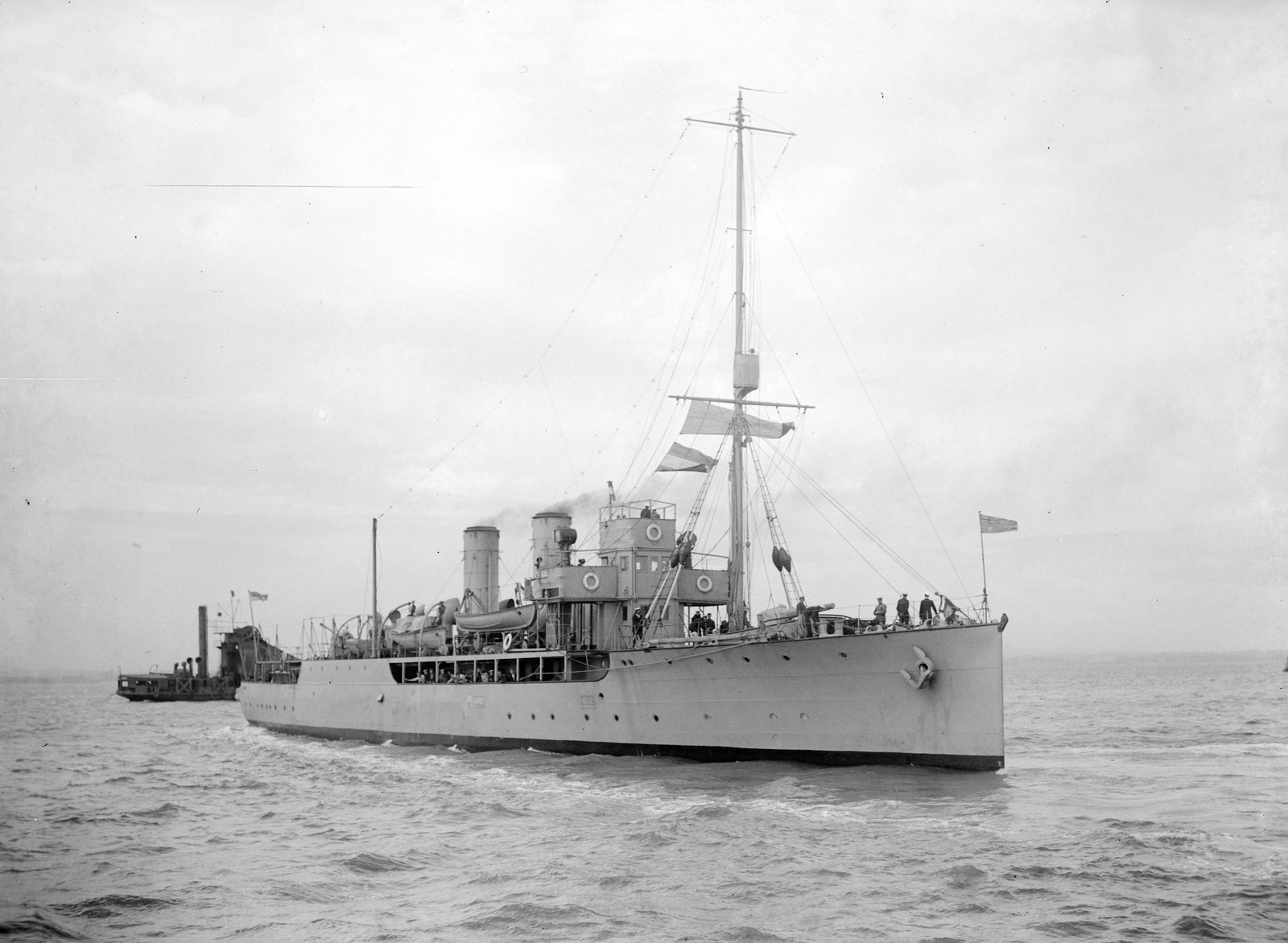
- HMAS Geranium

Class overview
- Name: Flower-class sloop
- Operators: Royal Navy

General characteristics

The Flower class comprised five sub-classes of sloops built under the Emergency War Programme for the Royal Navy during World War I, all of which were named after various flowers. They were popularly known as the "herbaceous borders", in humorous reference to a well-known adage about the Royal Navy ("Britain's best bulwarks are her wooden walls"), as well as to a type of garden arrangement popular in the United Kingdom.

== Fleet minesweepers ==
The Flowers were designed to be built at merchant shipyards, to ease the pressure on yards specializing in warships. The initial three groups were the first purpose-built fleet minesweepers, built with triple hulls at the bow to give extra protection against loss from mine damage when working. When submarine attacks on British merchant ships became a serious menace after 1916, the existing Flower-class minesweepers were transferred to convoy escort duty, and fitted with depth charges, as well as 4.7-inch naval guns.

- Acacia-class sloop: first group to be built, in 1915. 24 vessels built in two batches of 12. Two sunk during the war.
- Azalea-class sloop: 12 vessels built in 1915. Slightly modified Acacias; one sunk during the war.
- Arabis-class sloop: 36 vessels built 1915, a further eight for the French Navy. Five British, and one French vessel sunk.

Gentian and Myrtle were both lost to mines in the Baltic Sea on 16 July 1919.

== Submarine decoys (warship-Qs) ==
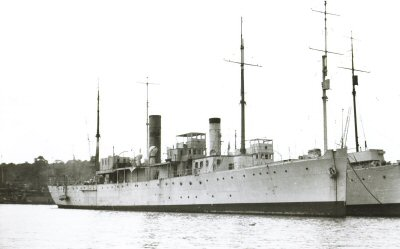
HMS Bryony as a Q-ship

The latter two groups, the Aubrietias and Anchusas, were designed as submarine decoys, or Q-ships, with hidden guns and a distinctive "merchant marine" appearance. These "warship-Qs" were thus the first purpose-built anti-submarine fighting ships, and their successor types were the anti-submarine sloops of World War II, which evolved into the modern anti-submarine warfare frigate during the 1939–45 Battle of the Atlantic.

- Aubrietia-class sloop: 12 vessels built 1916; two sunk.
- Anchusa-class sloop: 28 vessels built 1917. Saw service as Q-ships; six sunk.

== Service ==
Some 112 Flower-class vessel in total were built for the Royal Navy, and a further eight for the French Marine Militaire. Of these, 17 British and one French Flowers were sunk.

Some members of the class served as patrol vessels throughout the world during the peacetime years between the wars, but almost all were disposed of by World War II. This allowed the majority of the class names to be revived for the new, smaller Flower-class corvettes.

== Survivors ==
Two members of the final Anchusa group, Chrysanthemum and Saxifrage (renamed President in 1922), survived to be moored on the River Thames for use as drill ships by the RNVR until 1988, a total of seventy years in Royal Navy service. Chrysanthemum was sold to private owners and scrapped in 1995. President was sold and preserved, and is now one of the last three surviving warships of the Royal Navy built during the First World War (along with the 1914 light cruiser HMS Caroline in Belfast, and the 1915 monitor HMS M33 in Portsmouth dockyard).
