= HMS Westminster (L40) =

Destroyer of the Royal Navy

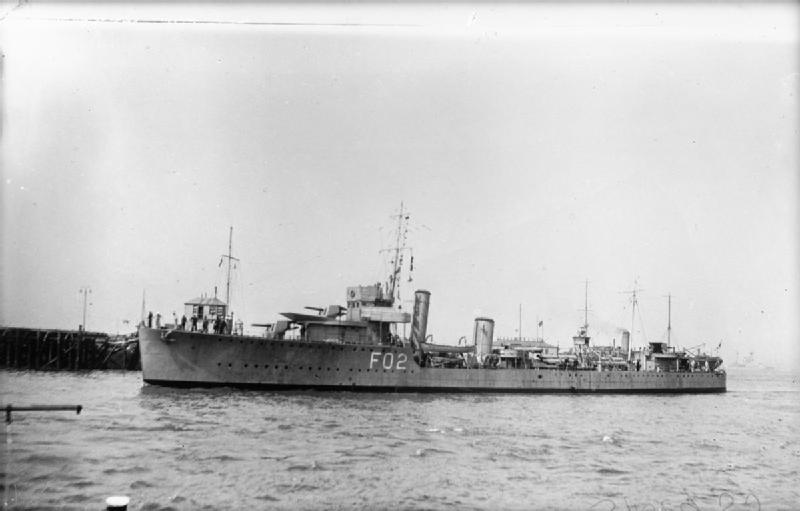
- HMS Westminster during the First World War

History

United Kingdom
- Name: HMS Westminster
- Ordered: 9 December 1916
- Builder: Scotts Shipbuilding and Engineering Company, Greenock
- Laid down: April 1917
- Launched: 24 February 1918
- Commissioned: 18 April 1918
- Decommissioned: August 1948
- Reclassified: Escort destroyer in December 1939
- Identification: Pennant number L40
- Motto: Pro populo et gloria: 'For the people and glory'
- Honours and awards: North Sea 1940-43; English Channel 1943
- Fate: Sold on 4 March 1947 for breaking up
- Badge: On a Field Blue, a Portcullis Gold.

General characteristics
- Class & type: W-class destroyer
- Displacement: 1,100 tons
- Length: 312 ft (95.1 m) length overall; 300 ft (91.4 m) between perpendiculars
- Beam: 29 ft 6 in (9.0 m)
- Draught: 9 ft (2.7 m) standard; 13 ft 11 in (4.2 m) maximum
- Propulsion: Three Yarrow type Water-tube boilers; Brown-Curtis steam turbines; Two shafts; 27,000 shp (20,000 kW)
- Speed: 34-knot (63 km/h)
- Range: 320-370 tons oil, 3,500 nmi (6,500 km) at 15 knots (28 km/h), 900 nmi (1,700 km) at 32 knots (59 km/h)
- Complement: 110
- Armament: 6 × 21 in (533 mm) torpedo tubes; 4 × 4 in (102 mm) low-angled guns

HMS Westminster was a W-class destroyer of the Royal Navy. She was the first ship to bear the name. Launched in 1918, she served through two World Wars, and survived both to be sold for scrap in 1947.

== Construction and commissioning ==
Westminster was ordered on 9 December 1916 from Scotts Shipbuilding and Engineering Company, Greenock, Scotland with the 10th order of the 1916–17 Programme. She was laid down in April 1917, launched on 24 February 1918 and commissioned on 18 April 1918.

== First World War and interwar period ==
HMS Westminster's first role was escorting battle cruisers in the North Sea. She was later an escort for the German High Sea Fleet on its way to Rosyth in November 1918 after the German surrender.

Less than one month after the war ended, Westminster was required to help evacuate the crew of cruiser Cassandra when she struck a mine. Yet just one day later, in thick fog, Westminster herself collided with the V-class destroyer Verulam and needed extensive repair. Westminster then served in the Baltic and was damaged in action with Russian warships. She then served in the 6th Flotilla, Atlantic Fleet in 1921, before being reduced to the Reserve.

By 1939 an extensive rearmament programme was underway. A number of old V and W-class destroyers were selected for refitting into anti-aircraft escorts. Westminster was among those reactivated, and she was taken in hand by Devonport Dockyard. The conversion lasted until December 1939, during which her pennant number was changed from L50 to D45, to conform with use as an Escort Destroyer. She carried out post refit trials in December, and was then recommissioned and nominated to carry out convoy defence duty in the North Sea.

== Second World War ==
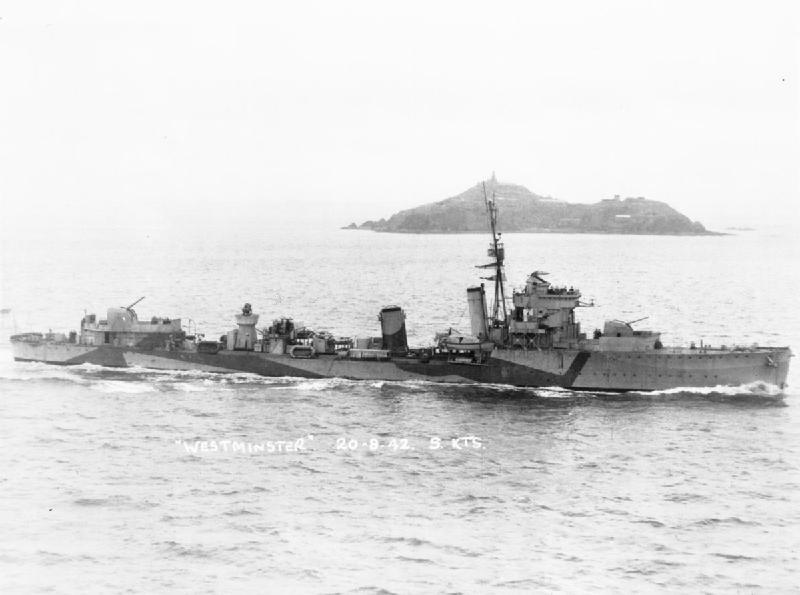
HMS Westminster in 1942 after her conversion into a convoy escort

Westminster joined the Rosyth Escort Force in January, and deployed with them until April, when she transferred to the Dover Command to support military activities and cover convoys in the English Channel. In early May, 1940, Westminster was one of four British destroyers supporting the French Army off the coast of Dunkirk, and supported the evacuation of Flushing. Her crew remained continuously at action stations for four days at a time and the ship successfully fought off air attacks, without any casualties until 15 May. On 20 May she struck a submerged wreck off Dunkirk and sustained considerable damage. She put into Dunkirk for repair works, and was the last ship to be repaired there before the town fell to the Germans.

She returned to active duty in June and for the rest of the war, she served with the Rosyth Escort Force protecting important shipping convoys in home waters. Part of this duty included screening the maiden voyage of the battleship King George V from Tyne to Rosyth. As Westminster had been converted for use as an escort and fitted with suitable high angle 4 in armament for anti-aircraft defence, she was retained for the protection of the vital East coast convoys and not deployed for other use such as support of the Allied landings in Normandy and service escorting of Russian convoys. She was also fitted with other weapons for attacks on E-boats as well as with special radio equipment for communication with aircraft and other escorts.

Westminster engaged E-boats of the 2nd German Flotilla on 12 October, in company with the destroyers Wolsey and Cotswold whilst defending convoy FN-31 as it sailed off the Norfolk coast. She was in action again against E-boats, this time off Lowestoft with the corvette Widgeon and motor gunboats 88 and 91. Westminster sank three E-boats in total. Only once was a German attack able to get past the escort to sink merchant shipping.

== Postwar ==
After the end of the war Westminster was briefly employed as a destroyer courier to Norway, but was withdrawn from operational service and paid-off by mid June. She was then reduced to the reserve and put on the disposal list in 1946. She was sold to BISCO on 4 March 1947 and towed to the breakers' yard in Charlestown, near Rosyth, arriving there during August 1948. She was then broken up.

== Bibliography ==
- Campbell, John (1985). Naval Weapons of World War II. Annapolis, Maryland: Naval Institute Press. ISBN 0-87021-459-4.
- Chesneau, Roger, ed. (1980). Conway's All the World's Fighting Ships 1922–1946. Greenwich, UK: Conway Maritime Press. ISBN 0-85177-146-7.
- Colledge, J. J.; Warlow, Ben (2006) [1969]. Ships of the Royal Navy: The Complete Record of All Fighting Ships of the Royal Navy from the 15th Century to the Present (3rd Rev ed.). London: Chatham Publishing. ISBN 978-1-86176-281-8. OCLC 67375475.
- Cocker, Maurice. Destroyers of the Royal Navy, 1893–1981. Ian Allan. ISBN 0-7110-1075-7.
- Friedman, Norman (2009). British Destroyers From Earliest Days to the Second World War. Annapolis, Maryland: Naval Institute Press. ISBN 978-1-59114-081-8.
- Gardiner, Robert & Gray, Randal, eds. (1985). Conway's All the World's Fighting Ships 1906–1921. Annapolis, Maryland: Naval Institute Press. ISBN 0-85177-245-5.
- Lenton, H. T. (1998). British & Empire Warships of the Second World War. Annapolis, Maryland: Naval Institute Press. ISBN 1-55750-048-7.
- March, Edgar J. (1966). British Destroyers: A History of Development, 1892–1953; Drawn by Admiralty Permission From Official Records & Returns, Ships' Covers & Building Plans. London: Seeley Service. OCLC 164893555.
- Preston, Antony (1971). 'V & W' Class Destroyers 1917–1945. London: Macdonald. OCLC 464542895.
- Raven, Alan & Roberts, John (1979). 'V' and 'W' Class Destroyers. Man o'War. Vol. 2. London: Arms & Armour. ISBN 0-85368-233-X.
- Rohwer, Jürgen (2005). Chronology of the War at Sea 1939–1945: The Naval History of World War Two (Third Revised ed.). Annapolis, Maryland: Naval Institute Press. ISBN 1-59114-119-2.
- Whinney, Bob (2000). The U-boat Peril: A Fight for Survival. Cassell. ISBN 0-304-35132-6.
- Whitley, M. J. (1988). Destroyers of World War 2. Annapolis, Maryland: Naval Institute Press. ISBN 0-87021-326-1.
- Winser, John de D. (1999). B.E.F. Ships Before, At and After Dunkirk. Gravesend, Kent: World Ship Society. ISBN 0-905617-91-6.
