= Vickers Medium Tank =

The Vickers Medium Tank may refer to one of the series of tanks built by Vickers-Armstrong during the 1920s:

- Vickers Medium Mark I
- Vickers Medium Mark II
- Medium Mark III, built by both Vickers-Armstrong and the Royal Ordnance Factory

See also: Vickers MBT, a low-cost British Main Battle Tank of the 1960s, designed for export.
