= HMS Aubrietia (1916) =

Minesweeper of the Royal Navy

History

United Kingdom
- Name: Aubrietia
- Ordered: January 1916
- Builder: Blyth Shipbuilding Company, Blyth, Northumberland
- Laid down: 1 January 1916
- Launched: 17 June 1916
- Identification: Pennant number: Q.13 (1916), T.06 (Jan, 1918)
- Fate: Sold 25 October 1922 to R.H. Partridge

General characteristics
- Class & type: Aubrietia-class sloop
- Displacement: 1,250 tons
- Length: 268 ft 0 in (81.69 m) o/a
- Beam: 33 ft 0 in (10.06 m)
- Draught: 11 ft 0 in (3.35 m)
- Propulsion: 1 × 4-cylinder triple expansion steam engine; 2000ihp; 2 boilers, coal; Single shaft, 1 screw
- Speed: 16.0 knots (29.6 km/h; 18.4 mph)
- Complement: 90 (RN)
- Armament: 2 × BL 4 inch Mk IX guns; 1 × 3-pounders (47 mm) AA.
- Armour: Triple hull in bows

HMS Aubrietia was one of 12 Aubrietia-class sloops completed for the Royal Navy and was launched in 1916. During World War I, she functioned as a Q-Ship and served under the name Q.13, also taking the names Kai, Winton and Zebal. Aubrietia was part of the 1st Sloop flotilla, based in Queenstown and subsequently, the 3rd Sloop Flotilla in the North Sea.

Aubrietia was sold for scrap on 25 October 1922.

== Design and construction ==
Aubrietia was one of 12 Aubrietia-class sloops completed for the Royal Navy and was launched in 1916.

She was originally designed as a minesweeper. As the first of the Aubrietia class, she was designed as single-screw fleet sweeping vessel, with a triple hull at the bows. The magazine was located aft above the water as protection against mine damage.

Aubrietia had a displacement of 1,250 tons. She was 268 feet (82 m) in length overall, had a beam of 33 feet (10 m), and a maximum draught of 11 feet (3 m).

The propulsion system consisted of a four-cylinder triple expansion engine, connected to a single propeller shaft. Maximum speed was 16.0 knots (29.6 km/h; 18.4 mph).

Aubrietia was laid down for the Royal Navy by Blyth Shipbuilding Company, Blyth, Northumberland, 1 January 1916 and launched on 17 June 1916.

== Service history ==
=== HMS Q.13 (Q-ship Aubrietia) ===
During World War I, Aubrietia was designated as Q.13 and served as a decoy Q-Ship. Her first captain was John Locke Marx, who was placed in command of Q.13 when she was still being readied for service on 20 August 1916.

Between October - December 1916, Q.13 was assigned to anti-submarine patrols in the English Channel and South Western Approaches. On 22 December 1918, Q.13, operating out of Devonport, interrupted the German submarine UC-18 which was in the process of boarding and scuttling the Danish steamer Hroptatyr west of the Channel Islands. In the rush to come alongside Hroptatyr, Q.13 collided with one of the Steamer's lifeboats, sinking it and killing Hroptatyr's captain. UC-18 dived away to avoid the sloop, and Q.13 dropped a depth charge in response, before picking up the survivors from Hroptatyr and the crew of the Danish steamer Dansborg, sunk by UC-18 earlier that day. UC-18 was undamaged.

On 12 January 1917, Q.13, operating out of Milford Haven under the name Kai and flying the Danish flag, encountered the German submarine UB-23 in the English Channel, off Les Casquets. After UB-23 fired two warning shots, Q.13 stopped and lowered a boat, simulating abandoning ship. The submarine then approached Q.13, and had closed to within 400 yards (370 m) when Q.13 uncovered her gun and opened fire, firing eight shells and hitting the submarine at least twice before UB-23 dived away, and then following up with two depth charges. Q.13's commander claimed that the submarine's conning tower had been blown off, but in fact the damage was not fatal, and UB-23 managed to safely return to base. Q.13's claim to have sunk the submarine was rejected by the Admiralty when a German complaint about British misuse of neutral flags showed that the submarine has survived. Q.13 was awarded a prize of £200 (rather than the £1000 for sinking a submarine) and her commander, John Locke Marx, was awarded the Distinguished Service Order. On 5 April 1917, U-46 fired a torpedo at Q.13, which missed. Q.13 was working with the British submarine E32 which later that day fired three torpedoes at U-46, which also missed.

As a decoy or Q-ship, Q.13 also sailed under other names including Kai, Winton and Zebal.

=== HMS Aubrietia ===
Q.13 reverted her name to HMS Aubrietia on 1 May 1917 and was listed as part of the First Sloop Flotilla operating in the Irish Sea, and based at Queenstown. On 20 June 1917, the Q-ship Salvia (Q.15) (a sister ship of Aubrietia) was engaged and sunk by the German submarine U-94. Five of Salvia's crew were killed and her commanding officer captured by U-94. The remaining survivors were picked up later that day by Aubrietia.

On 5 July 1917, Aubretia encountered the German submarine UC-71, which after an exchange of gunfire, dived away. On the evening of 7 July 1917, Aubrietia encountered another submarine off Fastnet (probably U-57), which dived away to safety after Aubrietia fired 10 shots in failing light. Marx left the command of Aubrietia on 24 September 1917.

On 19 October 1917, Aubrietia was part of the escort for Convoy HD7 when the Armed Merchant Cruiser Orama, another of the convoy's escort, was torpedoed and sunk by the German submarine U-62. Aubrietia took part in the search for survivors.

Aubretia escorted homeward Dakar convoys HD22 (5 February 1918) and HD24 (3 March 1918). On 24 February 1918, Aubretia escorted convoy HE6. On 16 March 1918, Aubretia was involved in action against a suspected submarine whilst escorting convoy HE7. Following depth charge action by other vessels, Aubrietia spotted disturbance in water and dropped one charge. Spotting oil on the surface, Aubrietia dropped two more charges.

In May 1918 Aubrietia formed part of the Northern Patrol, but by the end of the war had transferred to the 3rd Sloop Flotilla based out of Dundee and operating in the North Sea.

== Decommissioning and fate ==
By November 1919, Aubrietia was held in reserve in Southampton. Aubrietia was sold for scrap to R.H. Partridge, 25 October 1922.
