= Battle of Dogger Bank (1916) =

Naval engagement of WW1

Coordinates: 54°43′28.63″N 2°46′06.80″E

- Part of the First World War
Date	10 February 1916
Location	off Dogger Bank, North Sea
Result	German victory

Belligerents
United Kingdom	German Empire

Commanders and leaders
(United Kingdom) Raymond Hallowell-Carew	(German Empire) Johannes Hartog

Strength
4 sloops	25 torpedo boats

Casualties and losses
1 sloop sunk 56 dead 14 captured	none
- Dogger Bank in the North Sea

The Battle of Dogger Bank on 10 February 1916 was a naval engagement between the Kaiserliche Marine of the German Empire and the Royal Navy of the United Kingdom, during the First World War. Three German torpedo boat flotillas sortied into the North Sea and encountered the British 10th Sloop Flotilla near Dogger Bank. The German vessels eventually engaged the British vessels, after mistaking them for cruisers instead of minesweeping sloops. Knowing they were out-gunned, the British attempted to flee and in the chase, the sloop HMS Arabis was sunk, before the British squadron escaped. As the cruisers of the Harwich Force returned to port, the light cruiser HMS Arethusa struck a mine, ran aground and broke in two. Although the Germans were victorious, they inflated the victory by reporting that they had sunk two cruisers.

== Background ==
Under the command of Admiral Hugo von Pohl German naval strategy had been to conserve the High Seas Fleet against the larger Royal Navy while waging war against British merchant shipping by submarine. At the start of 1916 Pohl became mortally ill; Admiral Reinhard Scheer took command of the High Seas Fleet on 18 January 1916 and the Germans began to consider an offensive strategy in the North Sea. Hitherto the German fleet had spared the army the burden of coast defence and encouraged the neutrality of the Netherlands and Scandinavia. The British naval blockade of Germany was causing food and raw material shortages and Scheer desired to find some means to counter British sea power.

The High Seas Fleet could only prevail against the Grand Fleet in exceptional circumstances, which its commander, Admiral Jellicoe, would never allow but Scheer thought that he could make the British war-weary; German raids in the North Sea became more frequent. On 9 February, the Admiralty warned the Grand Fleet that the Germans were preparing a sortie and the fleet was ordered south, the cruisers of Harwich Force being ordered to sail for Texel. A few hours later the alert was cancelled but next day, it was discovered that a force of German light cruisers and destroyers had sailed westwards from the Jade river.

The Germans sent 25 ships from the 2nd, 6th and 9th Torpedo-Boat flotillas (the German navy did not use the term destroyer) on a sortie to Dogger Bank under the command of Kommodore Johannes Hartog, to intercept Allied shipping. The British 10th Sloop Flotilla was the only British force in the area, consisting of HMS Arabis, Poppy, Buttercup, and Alyssum. Each of these 1,250-long-ton (1,270 t) Arabis-class sloops was armed with two 4.7 in (120 mm) guns and two 3-pounder anti-aircraft guns and were little match for the large number of German torpedo boats pitted against them.

== Battle ==
Arabis—along with the other three sloops of her division—had been engaged in sweeping a clear channel east of Dogger Bank when they were sighted by a large number of German torpedo boats. When the British sloops were first sighted, the Germans hesitated to attack as the new Arabis-class vessels could not be immediately identified. The Allied ships were mistaken for much more powerful cruisers but the Germans decided to press their attack anyway as they were in greater number. Upon being attacked, the British attempted to flee to the safety of the coast. Although Poppy, Buttercup and Alyssum were able to make good their escape, Arabis was not so fortunate and was caught and engaged by three of the German torpedo boats. After fighting off this attack, Arabis was attacked by six of the German boats and sunk by torpedoes. The Germans rescued Lieutenant-Commander Hallowell-Carew and 13 crew from Arabis.

== Aftermath ==
Besides some minor damage to a few of the German destroyers, the only losses from the action was Arabis, with 56 crew killed and 14 captured by the Germans, including the captain and two other officers. For his actions during the battle, Arabis′ commanding officer, Lieutenant Commander Robert Raymond Hallowell-Carew, received the Distinguished Service Order. Despite the fact that they had only sunk a minesweeping sloop, the Germans claimed that they had engaged a squadron of four new cruisers and sunk two of them with torpedoes. The Admiralty quickly responded by citing the truth, that no other Allied forces had been engaged besides the 10th Sloop Flotilla and that no cruisers had been sunk in the action.

After the action off Dogger Bank, the Battlecruiser Fleet from Rosyth, the 5th Light Cruiser Squadron from Harwich, and other elements of the Grand Fleet sailed. The forces assembled in the North Sea and swept southward but abandoned their efforts on 11 February, when it became clear that the only German forces at sea had been torpedo boats and that these had already returned to base. Returning from the sweep, the light cruiser HMS Arethusa struck a German mine, laid in the Sledway channel near the North Cutler buoy the night before, by the submarine SM UC-7. Six men died in the explosion and the ship began to sink; several attempts to tow the ship failed in the heavy sea and Arethusa was driven onto the Cutler shoal and broke in two.
