= Clifford Kinvig =

British war studies lecturer

Major-General Clifford Kinvig
- Born: Clifford Arthur Kinvig; 22 November 1934
- Died: 22 February 2017 (aged 82)

Clifford Arthur Kinvig (22 November 1934 – 22 February 2017) was senior lecturer in war studies at the Royal Military Academy, Sandhurst, director of education of the British Army, and a noted military author who debunked some of the myths about the bridge over the River Kwai and the construction of the Burma Railway.

== Early life ==
Clifford Kinvig was born on 22 November 1934 to a family of Manx origins. His father was Frank Kinvig, a Liverpool warehouseman, and his mother was Dorothy. The Times, in their 2017 obituary of Kinvig, noted that the name was an anagram of Viking and that it was not unusual on the Isle of Man which had been settled by the Vikings in the tenth century. Kinvig was educated at Waterloo Grammar School in Liverpool and subsequently read history at the University of Durham.

Kinvig married Shirley Acklam in 1956 and they had three children.

== Career ==
After university, Kinvig was commissioned into the Royal Army Educational Corps during his national service. He stayed on and took a regular commission, rising to the rank of major-general in the education corps where he specialised in officer education. He was director of education of the British Army and a senior lecturer in war studies at the Royal Military Academy, Sandhurst.

== Writing ==
Kinvig's first book was Death Railway published by Pan Books in 1973, part of the Pan/Ballantine illustrated history of the Second World War. He followed this with his masterwork, River Kwai Railway: Story of the Burma-Siam Railroad, published by Brassey's in 1992, which critically examined the story of the construction of the Burma Railway during the Second World War on which the film The Bridge on the River Kwai (1957) was based. The book was translated into Japanese and Serbo-Croat.

Scapegoat: General Percival of Singapore (1996) examined the role of general Arthur Percival in the defence and subsequent capitulation to the Japanese of Singapore during the Second World War. He later contributed a chapter on Percival to Sixty Years On: The Fall of Singapore Revisited (2002) which was described by Stanley L. Falk in The Journal of Military History as "a balanced and long overdue defense of General Percival". His final book was Churchill's Crusade: The British Invasion of Russia 1918–1920, published by Continuum in 2006, which the publisher described as the first complete account of the operation.

Kinvig died on 22 February 2017.

== Selected publications ==
- Death railway. Pan Books, London, 1973. (Pan/Ballantine illustrated history of World War 2: campaign books.) ISBN 0-345-09779-3
- River Kwai railway: The story of the Burma-Siam railroad. Brassey's, London, 1992. ISBN 0-08-037344-5
- Scapegoat: General Percival of Singapore. Brassey's, London, 1996. (Brasseys Biographies) ISBN 1-85753-171-X
- "General Percival and the fall of Singapore" in Brian P. Farrell & Sandy Hunter (Eds.) 60 Years on: The fall of Singapore revisited. Eastern University Press, Singapore, 2002. ISBN 981-210-202-7
- Churchill's crusade: The British invasion of Russia, 1918–1920. Continuum, London, 2006. ISBN 1-85285-477-4
