= Azalea-class sloop =

Class of British Navy warships

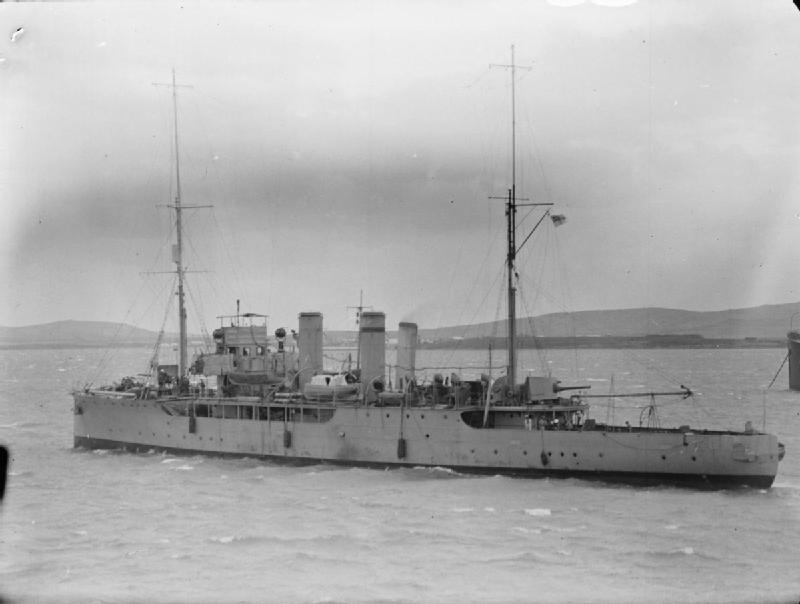
- HMS Azalea

Class overview
- Name: Azalea class
- Operators: Royal Navy; Belgian Navy; Kriegsmarine
- Preceded by: Acacia class
- Succeeded by: Arabis class
- Built: 1915
- In service: 1915–1952
- In commission: 1915–1927
- Completed: 12
- Lost: 3
- Retired: 9

General characteristics
- Type: Sloop
- Displacement: 1,210 long tons (1,230 t)
- Length: 250 ft (76 m) p/p; 262 1/2 ft (80.0 m) o/a
- Beam: 33 ft (10 m)
- Draught: 11 1/4 ft (3.4 m)
- Propulsion: 1 × 4-cylinder triple expansion engine; 2 × cylindrical boilers; 1 screw
- Speed: 17 knots (31 km/h; 20 mph)
- Range: 2,000 nmi (3,700 km; 2,300 mi) at 15 kn (28 km/h; 17 mph)
- Endurance: 130 t (130 long tons) of coal
- Complement: 79
- Armament: 2 × 1 – QF 4 in (100 mm) guns or QF 4.7 in (120 mm) guns; 2 × 1 – 3-pounder (47 mm) AA guns

The Azalea class of twelve minesweeping sloops were built under the Emergency War Programme for the Royal Navy in World War I as part of the larger Flower class, which were also referred to as the Cabbage class, or "Herbaceous Borders". (Note: Together with the following Arabis class, Aubrietia class and Anchusa class, these classes were collectively known as Flower-class sloops.) The third batch of twelve ships to be ordered in May 1915, they differed from the preceding Acacia class only in mounting a heavier armament. One ship, converted to a Q-ship was lost during the war, another during the Allied intervention in the Russian Civil War in 1919. With the exception of two others, the rest were scrapped. One entered mercantile service, while the other was transferred to the Belgian Navy. Both were captured by the Germans during World War II and put into German service. One was lost with the final ship being scrapped in 1952

== Design and description ==
The Azaleas were a series of twelve minesweeping sloops that were designed to operate as minesweepers with the fleet at the beginning of World War I. A shortage of this type required their quick construction. Their hulls were built to a simplified design in order to speed construction and were built under Lloyd's survey instead of normal naval requirements. The hull of the ships have flare but lack sheer and the forecastle extending to just abaft the foremast. The vessels had a triple hull at the bow to give extra protection against loss when working. Their appearance was marked by widely spread masts, bridge and two funnels. However, they also acted as dispatch vessels or carrying out towing operations, but as the war continued and the threat from German submarines grew, became increasingly involved in anti-submarine duties.

The Azalea-class ships were nearly identical to the preceding Acacia class and measured 250 feet (76 m) long between perpendiculars and 262 1/2 ft (80.0 m) overall with a beam of 33 ft (10 m) and a draught of 11 1/4 ft (3.4 m). (Note: Measurements of the ships vary between the sources. Parkes has the draught at 12 ft (3.7 m) while Gardiner & Gray have it at 11 ft (3.4 m).) They had a normal displacement of 1,210 long tons (1,230 t), (Note: Gardiner & Gray have the normal displacement as 1,210 long tons (1,230 t).) and 1,325 t (1,304 long tons) fully loaded. The Azaleas were propelled by a single propeller connected by a single shaft to a 4-cylinder triple expansion engine powered by steam from two cylindrical boilers creating 1,800 indicated horsepower (1,300 kW). (Note: The created power varies between sources. Cocker states 2,200 ihp (1,600 kW) while Le Fleming has 2,400 hp (1,800 kW).) The ships carried a maximum of 130 t (130 long tons) of coal as a fuel source and had a maximum speed of 17 knots (31 km/h; 20 mph). (Note: Speed varies between sources, ranging from 16.5 kn (30.6 km/h; 19.0 mph) to 15–17 knots (28–31 km/h; 17–20 mph)) Their single screw gave them a wide turning circle.

The sloops were designed to be armed with two single-mounted QF 4.7-inch (120 mm) low-angle guns as protection against German raids on the minesweeping flotillas. However, late in production, some of the vessels were given QF 4 in (100 mm) guns. For anti-aircraft (AA) defence, the Azaleas mounted two by single 3-pounder (47 mm) AA guns. The complement of the vessels ranged from 79 to 80 officers and ratings.

== Ships of the class ==
Construction data
Ship	Builder	Launched	Fate
Azalea	Barclay Curle & Company, Whiteinch	10 September 1915	Sold for breaking up on 1 February 1923.
Begonia	Barclay Curle & Company, Whiteinch	26 August 1915	Became Q-ship from 9 August 1917 as Q10 (SS Dolcis Jessop), sunk in collision with German submarine U-151 off Casablanca in the Atlantic Ocean on 2 October 1917.
Camellia	Bow, McLachlan and Company, Paisley	25 September 1915	Sold for breaking up on 15 January 1923.
Carnation	Greenock & Grangemouth Dockyard Company, Greenock	6 September 1915	Sold for breaking up 14 January 1922.
Clematis	Greenock & Grangemouth Dockyard Company, Greenock	29 July 1915	Sold for breaking up on 5 February 1931.
Heliotrope	Lobnitz & Company, Renfrew	10 September 1915	Sold for breaking up on 7 January 1935.
Jessamine	Swan Hunter & Wigham Richardson, Wallsend	9 September 1915	Sold for breaking up on 21 December 1922
Myrtle	Lobnitz and Company, Renfrew	11 October 1915	Mined in Gulf of Finland on 16 July 1919.
Narcissus	Napier & Miller, Old Kilpatrick	22 September 1915	Sold for breaking up on 6 September 1922.
Peony	Archibald McMillan & Son, Dumbarton	27 October 1915	Sold out of service on 20 August 1919, becoming mercantile Ardena. Sunk by mine on 28 September 1943.
Snowdrop	Archibald McMillan & Son, Dumbarton	7 October 1915	Sold for breaking up on 15 January 1923.
Zinnia	Swan Hunter & Wigham Richardson, Wallsend	12 August 1915	Sold to Belgian Navy on 19 April 1920, retaining same name. Scrapped 1952.

== Construction and career ==
Officially termed "Fleet Sweeping Vessels (Sloops)" by the Royal Navy, the Azalea-class ships were intended to be built quickly and were designed to merchant vessel construction parameters so they could be constructed in non-naval shipyards. They were primarily intended for minesweeping duties but were adapted to various other duties throughout the war. They had an average construction period of 25 weeks. The Azaleas were ordered in May 1915 as part of the War Emergency Programme and entered service between September and December 1915. One, Begonia was converted to a Q-ship at Haulbowline, Ireland in 1916–1917 to resemble a small coastal trading vessel. Recommissioned on 9 August 1917 as Q10 and using the name Dolcis Jessop, the vessel had a short career as it was sunk in a collision with the German U-boat, SM U-151 off Casablanca on 2 October. Aside from Begonia, the rest of the class survived the war, with the majority sent for scrapping after the war in the early 1920s. Two, Peony and Zinnia continued in service. Another, Myrtle, was mined in 1919 during Royal Navy operations in the Baltic Sea as part of the Allied intervention in the Russian Civil War.

Peony was sold into mercantile service, converted to a passenger ferry and renamed Ardena. The ferry was used on the routes between Cherbourg and Caen. Ardena continued in service into World War II, where the vessel was sunk by the Luftwaffe in 1941 before being raised by the Germans and put back into service. On 28 September 1943 she was sailing from Cephalonia to Greece with 840 Italian prisoners of war when Ardena struck a mine and sank.

Zinnia was transferred to Belgium on 19 April 1920 and used for fishery protection duties by the new Royal Belgian Navy. In 1927, the Belgian Navy was disbanded and Zinnia was crewed by civilians. In 1940, the vessel was captured by the Germans and was rebuilt at Antwerp for service with the Kriegsmarine as the now renamed Barbara. Barbara survived the war and was returned to the Belgians following it. Renamed Breydel, the vessel was scrapped in 1952.
