= Arabis-class sloop =

1915 class of British minesweepers

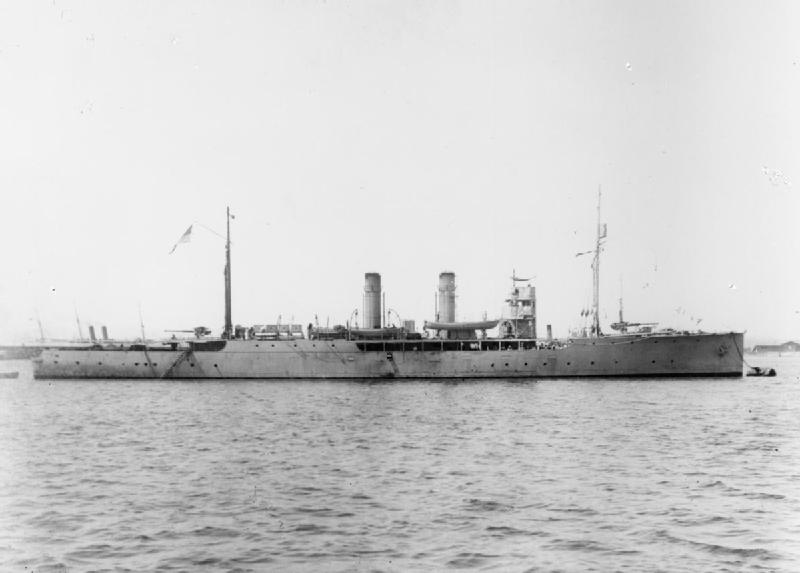
- HMS Wistaria

Class overview
- Operators: Royal Navy; French Navy; Portuguese Navy; Royal Danish Navy; Republic of China Navy
- Preceded by: Azalea class
- Succeeded by: Aubrietia class
- Built: 1915
- In commission: 1915–1941
- Completed: 44
- Lost: 7

General characteristics
- Type: Minesweeper
- Displacement: 1,200 tons
- Length: 255 ft 3 in (77.80 m) p/p; 267 ft 9 in (81.61 m) o/a
- Beam: 33 ft 6 in (10.21 m)
- Draught: 11 ft 9 in (3.58 m)
- Propulsion: 1 × 4-cylinder triple expansion engine; 2 × cylindrical boilers; 1 screw
- Speed: 17 knots (31 km/h; 20 mph)
- Range: 2,000 nmi (3,700 km; 2,300 mi) at 15 kn (28 km/h; 17 mph) with max. 260 tons of coal
- Complement: 79
- Armament: Typically 2 × 4 or 4.7 in (120 mm) guns and 2 × 3-pounder (47 mm) AA with some lesser variants

The Arabis class was the third, and largest, of the five sub-classes of minesweeping sloops completed under the Emergency War Programme for the Royal Navy in World War I. They were part of the larger "Flower class" shipbuilding project, which were also referred to as the "Cabbage class", or "Herbaceous Borders". The ships were also used outside their minesweeping duties as patrol vessels, tugs, and personnel and cargo transports.

The design for the Arabis class was made at the end of 1914. All 36 British vessels were ordered in July 1915, and were built in three batches, averaging 12 vessels. A further 8 vessels were later built in British shipyards for the French Navy. The design was highly appealing, as most shipyards were capable of building them, and construction could be completed in five months.

Like the preceding Acacia and Azalea-class sloops, these were single-screw Fleet Sweeping Vessels (Sloops) with triple hulls at the bows to give extra protection against loss when working. The strength of the hull was demonstrated when Valerian fought the 1926 Havana–Bermuda hurricane for five hours on 22 October, 1926, before being driven over by a squall and foundering off Bermuda. In his report to the Court Martial held at the Royal Naval Dockyard, Bermuda, her Captain, Commander W. A. Usher, wrote:

At Noon, the centre of the storm was reached and the clearing came. The seas were now mountainous and seemed to approach the ship from all sides, but more particularly from the South and East. As the ship balanced on the crest, or fell into the trough, it seemed as if she must break her back and it speaks very well of her construction that she withstood these stresses so well. So far no damage had been done to the hull or fittings.

== Ships ==
- HMS Alyssum — built by Earle's Shipbuilding and Engineering Company, Kingston upon Hull, launched 5 November 1915. Mined south-west of Ireland 18 March 1917.
- HMS Amaryllis — built by Earle's, launched on 9 December 1915. Sold for breaking up on 30 January 1923.
- HMS Arabis — built by D. & W. Henderson and Company, Partick, launched on 6 November 1915. Sunk by German torpedo boats off the Dogger Bank 10 February 1916.
- HMS Asphodel — built by Henderson, launched 21 December 1915. Sold to Denmark 16 June 1920, renamed Fylla.
- HMS Berberis — built by Henderson, launched 3 February 1916. Sold 30 January 1923.
- HMS Buttercup — built by Barclay Curle and Company, Whiteinch, launched 24 October 1915. Sold 5 February 1920, becoming mercantile salvage vessel Semper Paratus; Italian Navy from 1933 as Teseo. Bombed at Trapani 11 April 1943.
- HMS Campanula — built by Barclay Curle, launched 25 December 1915. Sold for breaking up 6 September 1922.
- HMS Celandine — built by Barclay Curle, launched 19 February 1916. Sold for breaking up 15 January 1923.
- HMS Cornflower — built by Barclay Curle, launched 30 March 1916. Lost 19 December 1941 at the fall of Hong Kong.
- HMS Crocus — built by Lobnitz and Company, Renfrew, launched 24 December 1915. Sold at Bombay in July 1930.
- HMS Cyclamen — built by Lobnitz, launched 22 February 1916. Famous for the erroneous attack against an allied submarine, Italian Guglielmotti (1917). Patrolled the Persian Gulf and, in May 1921 took part in the punitive bombardment of Ajman Fort together with HMS Crocus. Sold for breaking up 2 July 1932.
- HMS Delphinium — built by Napier and Miller, Old Kilpatrick, launched 23 December 1915. Sold for breaking up 13 October 1933.
- HMS Genista — built by Napier & Miller, launched 26 February 1916. Sunk by German submarine SM U-57 in the Atlantic 23 October 1916.
- HMS Gentian — built by Greenock & Grangemouth Dockyard Company, launched 23 December 1915. Mined in the Gulf of Finland, 16 July 1919.
- HMAS Geranium, built by Greenock & Grangemouth, launched 8 November 1915. Transferred to the Royal Australian Navy in 1919; dismantled June 1932; sunk as a target 24 April 1935 off Sydney.
- HMS Gladiolus — built by Charles Connell and Company, Scotstoun, launched 25 October 1915. Sold in Portugal 10 March 1920, becoming Portuguese warship NRP República classified as a cruiser, discarded 1943.
- HMS Godetia — built by Connell, launched 8 January 1916. Broken up 1937.
- HMS Hydrangea — built by Connell, launched 2 March 1916. Sold at Hong Kong 7 April 1920 for mercantile use.
- HMS Lobelia — built by William Simons and Company, Renfrew, launched 7 March 1916. Sold to Newfoundland Government in March 1920 under same name; hulked 1924.
- HMS Lupin — built by Simons, launched 31 May 1916. Sold 22 March 1946, but foundered; raised and broken up at Portchester.
- HMAS Marguerite, built by Dunlop Bremner & Company, Port Glasgow, launched 23 November 1915. Transferred to Royal Australian Navy in 1919; dismantled September 1932; sunk as a target 1 August 1935.
- HMS Mignonette — built by Dunlop and Bremner, launched 26 January 1916. Mined off Galley Head, Ireland 17 March 1917.
- HMS Myosotis — built by Bow, McLachlan and Company, Paisley, launched 4 April 1916. Sold for breaking up 30 January 1923.
- HMS Nasturtium — built by A. McMillan and Sons, Dumbarton, launched 21 December 1915. Mined 27 April 1916 near Malta.
- HMS Nigella — built by William Hamilton and Company, Port Glasgow, launched 10 December 1915. Sold for breaking up 29 November 1922.
- HMS Pansy — built by Hamilton, launched 1 February 1916. Sold to Calcutta Port Commissioners 12 January 1920 under same name.
- HMS Pentstemon — built by Workman, Clark and Company, Belfast, launched 5 February 1916. Sold 20 April 1920, becoming mercantile Lila, ended up in China as gunboat Hai Chow. Sunk by Japanese aircraft at Canton 7 October 1937.
- HMS Petunia — built by Workman, Clark, launched 3 April 1916. Sold for breaking up 15 December 1922.
- HMS Poppy — built by Swan Hunter and Wigham Richardson, Wallsend on Tyne, launched 9 November 1915. Sold for breaking up 9 April 1923.
- HMS Primula — built by Swan Hunter, launched 6 December 1915. Sunk by German submarine SM U-35 in the Mediterranean 1 March 1916.
- HMS Rosemary — built by Richardson, Duck and Company, Thornaby-on-Tees, launched 22 November 1915. It was hit by a torpedo from SM U-63 on 4 July 1916. It was the last coal powered ship in the Royal Navy. Sold for breaking up 17 December 1947.
- HMS Snapdragon — built by Ropner and Sons, Stockton on Tees, launched 21 December 1915. Sold for breaking up 4 May 1934.

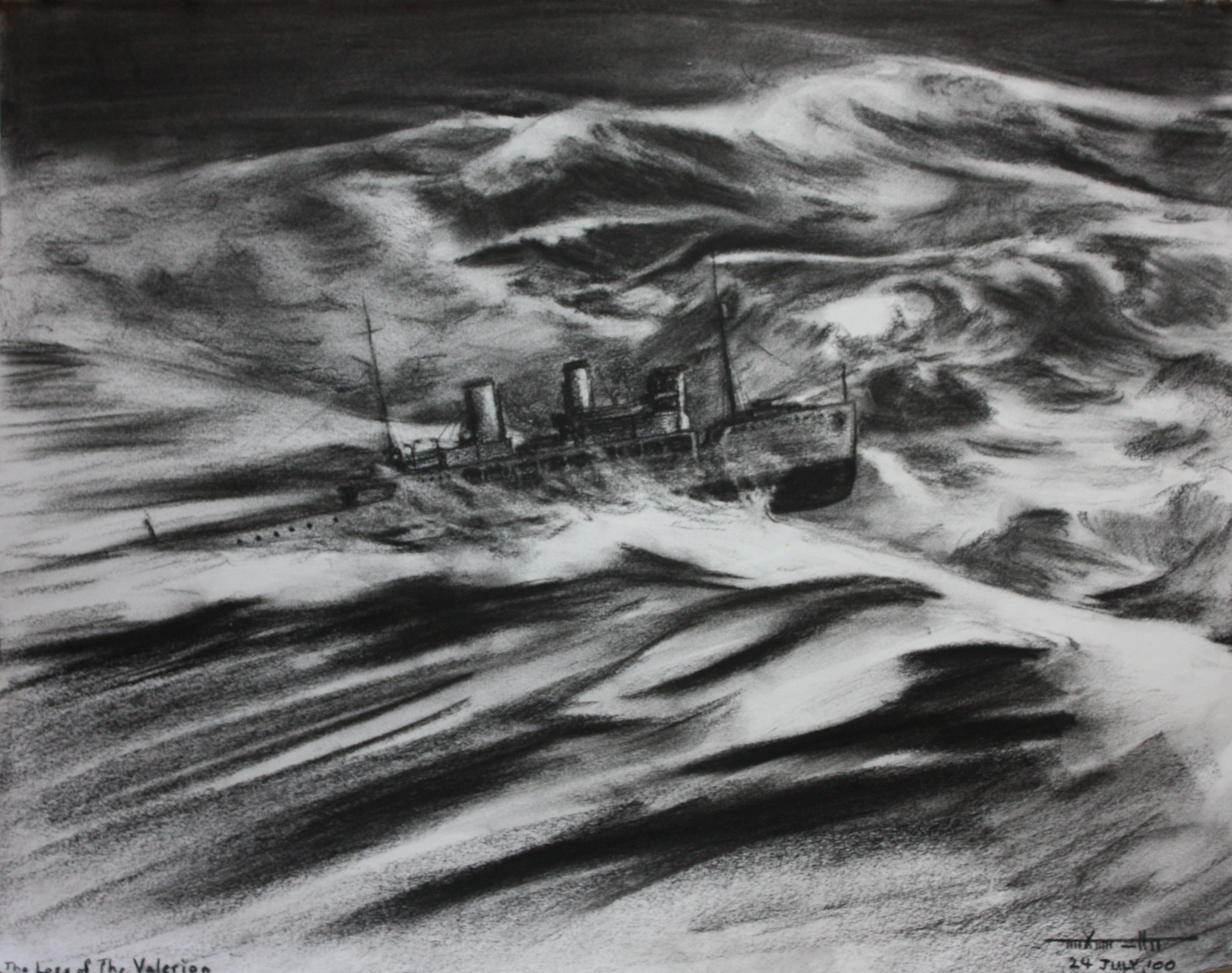
Artist's impression of the loss of HMS Valerian

- HMS Valerian — built by Charles Rennoldson and Company, South Shields, launched 21 February 1916. Foundered off Bermuda in the 1926 Havana–Bermuda hurricane, on 22 October 1926.
- HMS Verbena — built by Blyth Shipbuilding and Dry Dock, Blyth, launched 9 November 1915. Sold for breaking up 13 October 1933.
- HMS Wallflower — built by Irvine's Shipbuilding and Dry Dock Company, West Hartlepool, launched 8 November 1915. Sold for breaking up 28 August 1931.
- HMS Wistaria — built by Irvine's, launched 7 December 1915. Sold for breaking up 18 January 1931.

Six vessels were ordered in January 1916, and another two in September 1916, all to this design from British shipyards for the French Navy, and all were delivered to France in 1916 or (the last pair) 1917:

- Aldébaran, built by Barclay Curle, launched 19 May 1916, and commissioned 3 July 1916. Served in Mediterranean in First World War and overseas post war. Stricken 13 October 1934 at Saigon and sold for scrap 15 January 1935.
- Algol, built by Barclay Curle, launched 17 June 1916, and commissioned 1 August 1916. Served in Mediterranean in First World War, and operated off Syria in 1921 and in the Far East. Scrapped Saigon 1935.
- Altair, built by Hamilton, laid down 28 February 1916, launched 6 July 1916 and commissioned 14 September 1916. Served in Mediterranean in First World War, and in Black Sea 1919. Deployed in Far East from 1920, and served as Survey ship off French Indo-China from 193. Sold for Scrap at Saigon 1940.
- Antares, built by Hamilton, laid down 8 March 1916, launched 4 September 1916 and commissioned 30 October 1916. Served in Mediterranean in First World War, and overseas post war. Converted to Survey ship at Saigon 1935 but sold for scrap 1936.
- Bellatrix, built by Henderson, launched 29 May 1916. Deleted 1933.
- Rigel, built by Henderson, launched 6 July 1916. Sunk by German submarine SM U-35 off Algiers 2 October 1916.
- Cassiopée, built by Barclay Curle, launched 10 February 1917. Deleted 1933.
- Regulus, built by Barclay Curle, launched 19 March 1917. Deleted 1935.
