= Acacia-class sloop =

1915 class of British sloops-of-war

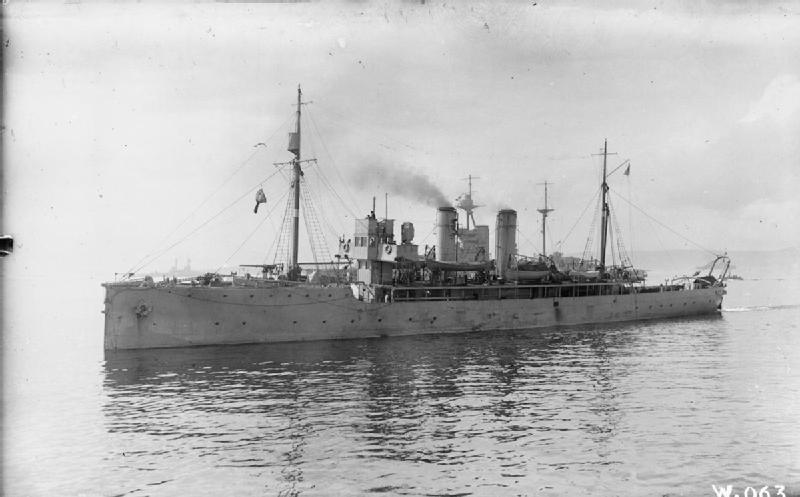
- HMS Acacia

Class overview
- Name: Acacia class
- Operators: Royal Navy; Portuguese Navy
- Succeeded by: Azalea class
- Built: 1915
- In commission: 1915–1959
- Completed: 24
- Lost: 3

General characteristics
- Type: Minesweeper
- Displacement: 1,200 tons
- Length: 250 ft (76.2 m) p/p; 262 ft 6 in (80.01 m) o/a
- Beam: 33 ft (10.1 m)
- Draught: 12 ft (3.7 m)
- Propulsion: 1 × 4-cylinder triple expansion engine; 2 × cylindrical boilers; 1 screw
- Speed: Designed for 1,400 hp (1,040 kW) or 1,800 hp (1,340 kW) to make 17 knots (31 km/h), but actually required about 2,200 ihp (1,640 kW) for this speed
- Range: 2,000 nmi (3,700 km) at 15 kn (28 km/h) with max. 250 tons of coal
- Complement: 77 men
- Armament: Designed to mount 2 × 12-pounder (76 mm) guns and 2 × 3-pounder (47 mm) AA guns, but with wide variations

The Acacia class was a class of twenty-four sloops that were ordered in January 1915 under the Emergency War Programme for the Royal Navy in World War I as part of the larger Flower class which were also referred to as the "Cabbage class", or "Herbaceous Borders". They were ordered in two batches, twelve ships on 1 January and another twelve on 12 January, and all were launched within about four or five months, and delivered between May and September 1915. They were used almost entirely for minesweeping until 1917, when they were transferred to escort duty.

They were single-screw fleet sweeping vessels (sloops) with triple hulls at the bows to give extra protection against loss when working.

== Ships ==
- Acacia — built by Swan Hunter & Wigham Richardson, Wallsend on Tyne, launched 15 April 1915. Sold 6 September 1922.
- Anemone — built by Swan Hunter, launched 13 May 1915. Sold for breaking up 6 September 1922.
- Aster — built by Earle's Shipbuilding & Engineering Co, Kingston upon Hull, launched 1 May 1915. Mined 4 July 1917 in the Mediterranean.
- Bluebell — built by Scotts Shipbuilding and Engineering Company, Greenock, launched 24 July 1915. Sold for breaking up 26 May 1930.
- Daffodil — built by Scotts, launched 17 August 1915. Sold for breaking up 22 February 1935.
- Dahlia — built by Barclay Curle & Company, Whiteinch, launched 21 April 1915. Sold for breaking up 2 July 1932.
- Daphne — built by Barclay Curle, launched 19 May 1915. Sold for breaking up 15 January 1923.
- Foxglove — built by Barclay Curle, launched 30 March 1915, to guardship 1942, base ship 1943, sold for breaking up 7 September 1946.
- Hollyhock — built Barclay Curle, launched 1 May 1915. Sold for breaking up 7 October 1930.
- Honeysuckle — built by Lobnitz & Company, Renfrew, launched 29 April 1915. Sold 6 September 1922.
- Iris — built by Lobnitz, launched 2 June 1915. Sold 26 January 1920, becoming mercantile Principe d'Asturias.
- Jonquil — built by Charles Connell and Company, Scotstoun, launched 12 May 1915. Sold May 1920 in Portugal, becoming Portuguese warship NRP Carvalho Araújo, classified as a cruiser, discarded 1959.
- Laburnum — built by C Connell & Co, launched 10 June 1915. Hulked as RNVR drill ship in Singapore 1935, lost in February 1942 at the fall of Singapore.
- Larkspur — built by Napier & Miller, Old Kilpatrick, launched 11 May 1915. Sold for breaking up in March 1922.
- Lavender — built by Archibald McMillan & Son, Dumbarton, launched 12 June 1915. Sunk by German submarine UC-75 in the English Channel, 4 May 1917.
- Lilac — built by Greenock & Grangemouth Dockyard Company, Greenock, launched 2 April 1915. Sold for breaking up 15 December 1922.
- Lily — built by Barclay Curle, launched 16 June 1915. Depot ship October 1923, renamed Vulcan II; renamed Adamant II in 1930. Sold for breaking up 25 June 1930.
- Magnolia — built by Scotts, launched 26 June 1915. Sold for breaking up 2 July 1932.
- Mallow — built by Barclay Curle, launched 13 July 1915. Transferred to Royal Australian Navy in July 1919, dismantled July 1932, sunk as target off Sydney 1 August 1935.
- Marigold — built by Bow, McLachlan and Company, launched 27 May 1915. Sold 26 January 1920, becoming mercantile Principe de Piamonte.
- Mimosa — built by Bow, MacLachlan & Co, launched 16 July 1915. Sold for breaking up 18 November 1922.
- Primrose — built by William Simons & Company, Renfrew, launched 29 June 1915. Sold for breaking up 9 April 1923.
- Sunflower — built by D. & W. Henderson & Company, Glasgow, launched 28 May 1915. Sold 27 January 1921 to Rangoon Port Commissioners, and renamed Lanbya. Resold 1923 to Osaka Shosen(O.S.K), and renamed Yashima Maru. Breaking up maybe 1953 .
- Veronica — built by Dunlop Bremner & Company, Port Glasgow, launched 27 May 1915. Sold for breaking up 22 February 1935.
