= Aubrietia-class sloop =

1916 class of British sloops-of-war

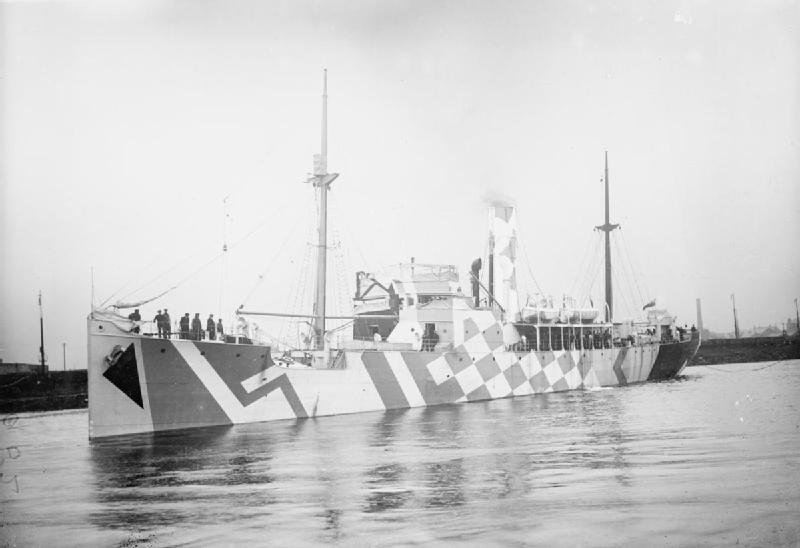
- HMS Polyanthus as a Q-ship during World War I

Class overview
- Name: Aubrietia class
- Operators: Royal Navy
- Preceded by: Arabis class
- Succeeded by: Anchusa class
- Built: 1916
- In commission: 1916–1932
- Completed: 12
- Lost: 3

General characteristics
- Type: Convoy escort Q-Ship: ("Warship-Q")
- Displacement: 1,250 tons
- Length: 255 ft 3 in (77.80 m) p/p; 267 ft 9 in (81.61 m) o/a
- Beam: 33 ft 6 in (10.21 m)
- Draught: 12 ft 6 in (3.81 m)
- Propulsion: 1 × 4-cylinder triple expansion engine; 2 × cylindrical boilers; 1 screw
- Speed: As designed: 17.5 knots (32.4 km/h) at 2,500 ihp (1,900 kW); Actual: 15-16.5 knots (30.6 km/h) at 2,500 ihp (1,900 kW); 17.5 knots (32.4 km/h) required 3,000 ihp (2,200 kW)
- Range: 205 tons of coal
- Complement: 80 men
- Armament: As designed: 3 × 12-pounder (76.2 mm) guns; 2 × 3-pounder (47 mm) AA; Actual: 2 × QF 4 inch Mk IV guns or BL 4 inch Mk IX guns; 1 × 3-pounder (47 mm) AA; depth charge throwers

The Aubrietia-class sloops were a class of twelve sloops built under the Emergency War Programme for the Royal Navy in World War I as part of the larger Flower class. They were also referred to as the "cabbage class", or "herbaceous borders". The Flowers were the first ships designed as minesweepers.

Like all the Flowers, the Aubrietia class were originally designed as single-screw fleet sweeping vessels, with triple hulls at the bows and an above-water magazine located aft, to give extra protection against loss from mine damage when working. However, the utility of the design was found to be as a convoy escort, and as such other classes took over the minesweeping role. The Aubrietias were re-classified as convoy sloops.

Unlike the preceding Flowers of the Acacia, Azalea and Arabis classes, with their unmistakable warship appearance, the Aubrietias were designed to look like small merchantmen, in the hope of deceiving U-boat commanders, a tactic known as the Q-ship. These vessels were built by commercial shipbuilders to Lloyd's Register standards, to make use of vacant capacity, and the individual builders were asked to use their existing designs for merchantmen, based on the standard Flower-type hull.

Two members of the following Anchusa group, HMS Chrysanthemum and HMS Saxifrage (renamed HMS President in 1922), survived to be moored on the River Thames for use as Drill Ships by the RNVR until 1988, a total of seventy years in RN service. President was sold in 1988 and preserved, and is now one of the last three surviving warships of the Royal Navy built during the First World War, (along with the 1914 light cruiser HMS Caroline in Belfast, and the 1915 monitor HMS M33 in Portsmouth dockyard).

== Ships ==
Six ships were ordered in January 1916:

- HMS Aubrietia — built by Blyth Shipbuilding Company, Blyth, launched 17 June 1916. Sold 25 October 1922.
- HMS Heather — built by Greenock & Grangemouth Dockyard Company, Greenock, launched 16 June 1916. Sold for breaking up 16 February 1932.
- HMS Salvia — built by Irvine's Shipbuilding & Dry Dock Company, West Harlepool, launched 16 June 1916. Sunk by German submarine U-94 off southwest Ireland 20 June 1917.
- HMS Tamarisk — built by Lobnitz & Company, Renfrew, launched 2 June 1916. Sold for breaking up 17 October 1922.
- HMS Tulip — built by Richardson, Duck and Company, Thornaby-on-Tees, launched 15 July 1916. Sunk by German submarine U-62 in the Atlantic 30 April 1917.
- HMS Viola — built by Ropner & Sons, Stockton-on-Tees, launched 14 July 1916. Sold for breaking up 17 December 1922.

A further six ships were ordered in December 1916:

- HMS Andromeda — built by Swan Hunter and Wigham Richardson, Wallsend on Tyne, launched June 1917. Transferred to French Navy, later renamed Ville d'Ys.
- HMS Gaillardia — built by Blyth Shipbuilding, launched 19 May 1917. Mined in the North Sea 22 March 1918.
- HMS Hibiscus — built by Greenck and Grangemouth, launched 17 November 1917. Sold for breaking up 18 January 1923.
- HMS Lychnis — built by William Hamilton and Company, Port Glasgow, launched 21 August 1917. Transferred to Royal Indian Marine in September 1921, renamed Cornwallis; sold 1946.
- HMS Montbretia — built by Irvine's, launched 3 September 1917. Sold 25 January 1921, becoming mercantile Chihuahua (Clan Line).
- HMS Polyanthus — built by Lobnitz, launched 24 September 1917. Sold 25 January 1921, becoming mercantile Colima (Clan Line).
