= 3-pounder gun =

3-pounder gun, 3-pounder, 3-pdr or QF 3-pdr is an abbreviation typically referring to a gun which fired a projectile weighing approximately 3 pounds. It may refer to:

- The Grasshopper cannon – of the 18th century
- QF 3-pounder Hotchkiss – Hotchkiss 47 mm naval gun used by many countries from 1885
- QF 3-pounder Nordenfelt – Nordenfelt 47 mm naval gun used by many countries from 1885
- QF 3-pounder Vickers – British Vickers 47 mm naval gun of World War I and World War II
- OQF 3-pounder gun – used to arm interwar Vickers Medium Tanks

== See also ==
- Category:47 mm artillery
