= Erland Cooper =

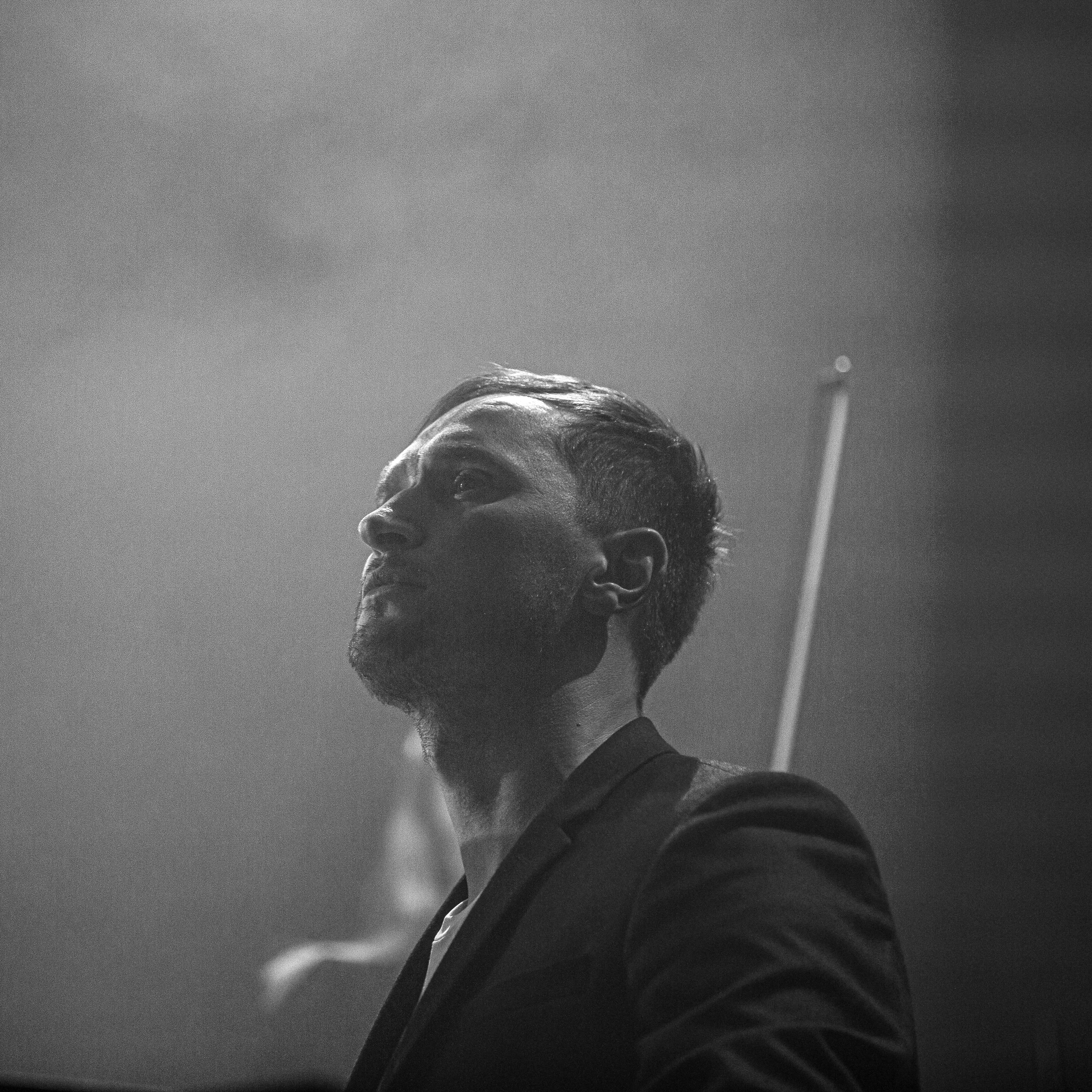

Background information
- Born: Gawain Erland Cooper; 5 October 1979 (age 47); Orkney, Scotland
- Genres: Alternative, classical, electronica, ambient
- Occupations: composer, producer
- Instruments: Piano, guitar, electronics
- Years active: 2010–present
- Labels: Decca Records, Universal Music
- Website: ErlandCooper.com

Erland Cooper is a Scottish composer, producer and multi-instrumentalist. Cited as "one of the most unique, consistently engaging composers of his generation", he was born and raised in Stromness, Orkney. As a solo artist, he has released five acclaimed studio albums, with multiple companion LPs & EPs, achieving a number 1 album in the UK classical charts and number 4 in the US Billboard classical crossover chart. This includes a trilogy of work inspired by his childhood home, as well as themes of nature, people, place and time. His work combines field recordings with classical orchestration and contemporary electronic elements. Cooper also works across mixed media projects including installation art, theatre and film. He is a recipient of a Royal Television Society award and his music is played frequently on BBC Radio 3 and BBC Radio 6 Music as well as featured on multiple television and film productions.

He is widely known for burying the only existing copy of the master magnetic tape of his first classical album, a violin concerto in Orkney, deleting all digital files and leaving only a treasure hunt of clues for fans and his record label alike to search for it. He buried the tape in early spring 2021 and intended to retrieve and release it in 2024. After a year and half in the soil, the tape was found in September 2022 by two amateur sleuths. It dried out on public display in record shops in Scotland for another year and a half and was released. Along with the premiere, a short documentary about the album's story called Recomposing Earth previewed. The record topped the UK official charts in 2024.

He is credited by Mojo Magazine with exploring the concept of psychogeography, connecting identity, memory, and place through music, words and cinematography. He explores these themes further by partnering with well-known artists and writers in his work and live shows.

He also works across mixed media projects including installation art & film. He was commissioned to score the soundtrack to the floral transformation of The Tower of London, entitled Superbloom, celebrating the Queen's Platinum Jubilee and he also scored the giant kinetic light installation Nest, celebrating London's first Borough of Culture, bringing together thousands of local voices from the community within his composition. His first feature film score, broadcast by National Geographic, earned him an Emmy, Critics Choice and RTS nomination.

Along with broadcast premières, his works have now been performed in the concert hall by the BBC Philharmonic, BBC Scottish Symphony Orchestra and Scottish Ensemble. He also tours with his own ensemble, playing piano, electronics and tape machines, performing on stages globally, reaching a growing audience of fans who are coming to his music through a combination of his projects, most often inspired by the natural world.

== Music career ==
=== Erland and the Carnival ===
In 2009, Cooper co-founded the band Erland and the Carnival in London with multi-instrumentalist Simon Tong.

=== The Magnetic North ===
In 2011 Cooper co-founded the British shoegaze band The Magnetic North with Simon Tong and singer, composer and orchestral arranger Hannah Peel. Formed in London, they released their debut album, Orkney: Symphony of the Magnetic North on 6 May 2012. Cooper said that the inspiration for the album came from an appearance of long dead Betty Corrigall in one of his dreams, insisting that he wrote an album about his home. This theme is currently being developed into a stage production.

=== Solo career ===
Cooper released his debut solo album Solan Goose, heavily influenced by native Orcadian birds, on 23 March 2018. The album is the first of a triptych that reflects on the natural world surrounding Orkney, with its tracks each taking their titles from Orcadian dialect words for birds.

Cooper's second album in the triptych, Sule Skerry, was released on 24 May 2019 on Phases. The album was included on the Scottish Album of The Year shortlist for 2020.

In 2022, Cooper provided a soundtrack, Music For Growing Flowers, to the Superbloom wildflower meadow installation within the moat of the Tower of London. The music has also been released as an album and a score.

=== Writing credits ===
Cooper is known for his contemporary arrangements of traditional Scottish and English folk songs, including most notably "Love Is a Killing Thing" and "The Derby Ram" collected by Ralph Vaughan Williams. He has also written for established artists, such as Paul Weller.

== Discography ==
=== With Erland & the Carnival ===
Studio albums

- 2010: Erland & the Carnival
- 2011: Nightingale
- 2014: Closing Time

=== With Magnetic North ===
Studio albums

- 2012: Orkney: Symphony of the Magnetic North
- 2016: Prospect of Skelmersdale

=== As a solo artist ===
Studio albums

- 2018: Solan Goose
- 2019: Sule Skerry
- 2020: Hether Blether
- 2023: Folded Landscapes
- 2024: Carve the Runes Then Be Content With Silence

Companion albums

- 2018: Murmuration (with William Doyle)
- 2019: Seachange (with Leo Abrahams)
- 2020: Landform (with Marta Salogni)
- 2021: Holm (Variations & B-sides)
- 2022: Music For Growing Flowers

EPs

- 2018: Nightflight
- 2020: Eynhallow
- 2021: Never Pass into Nothingness
- 2021: Egilsay
- 2021: The Island 1961
