= We're Here Because We're Here =

We're Here Because We're Here may refer to:

- We're Here Because We're Here (album), by the band Anathema
- We're Here Because We're Here (art event), commemorating the 100th anniversary of the first day of the Battle of the Somme, on 1 July 2016
- "We're Here Because We're Here", song sung in the World War I trenches to the tune of "Auld Lang Syne".
