= Dazzle ship (14–18 NOW) =

The Dazzle ships of the 14–18 NOW project are artworks created to commemorate the work of the artists and artisans who developed and designed the dazzle camouflage used in the First World War by ships as a defence against U-boat attack.

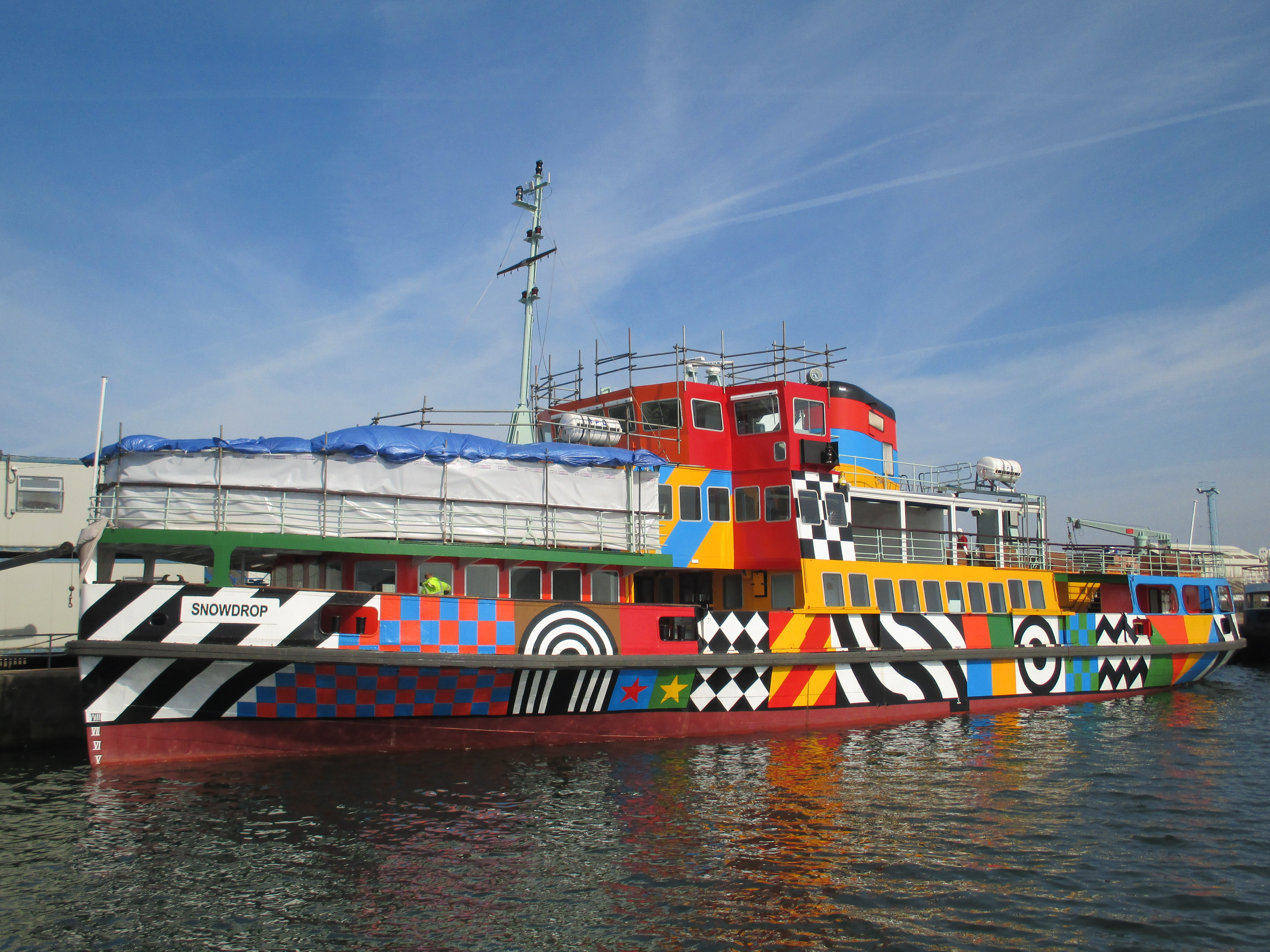
MV Snowdrop, at Birkenhead, in dazzle livery

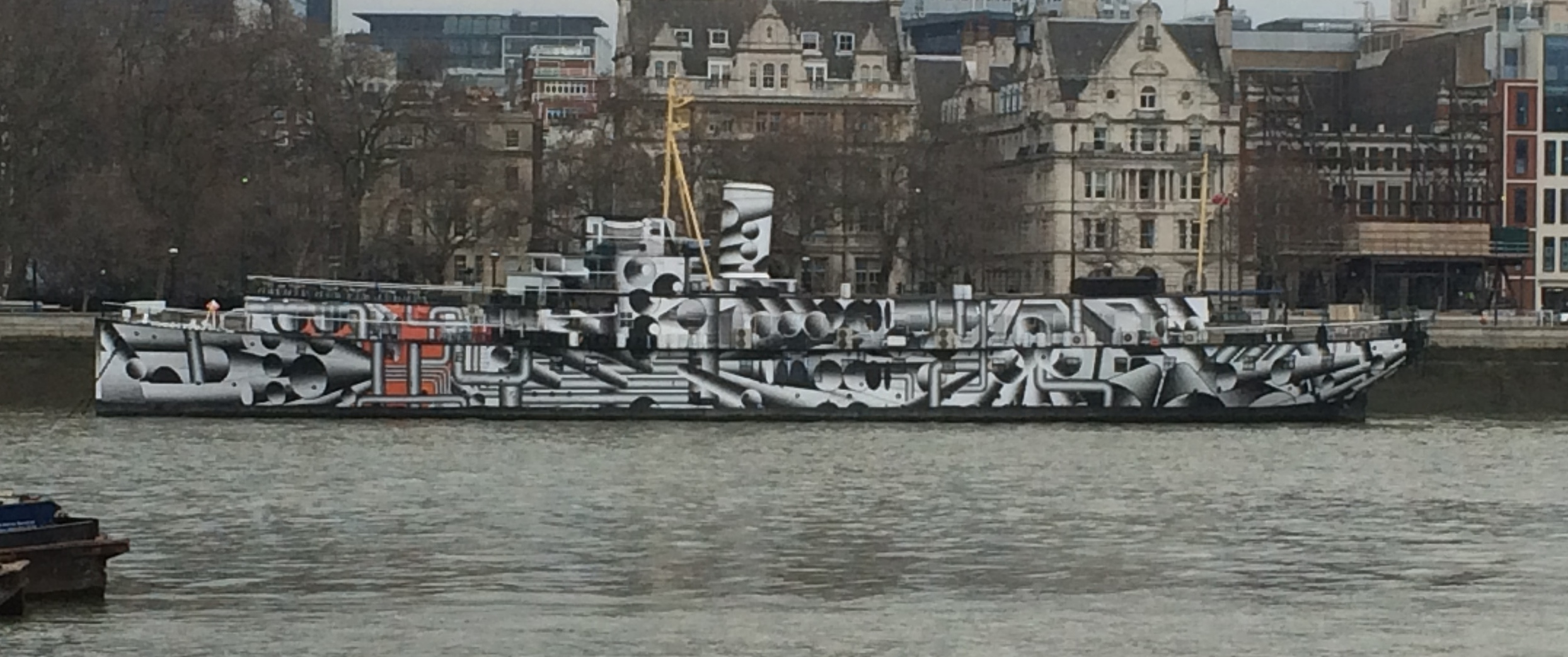
HMS President displaying dazzle livery by Tobias Rehberger

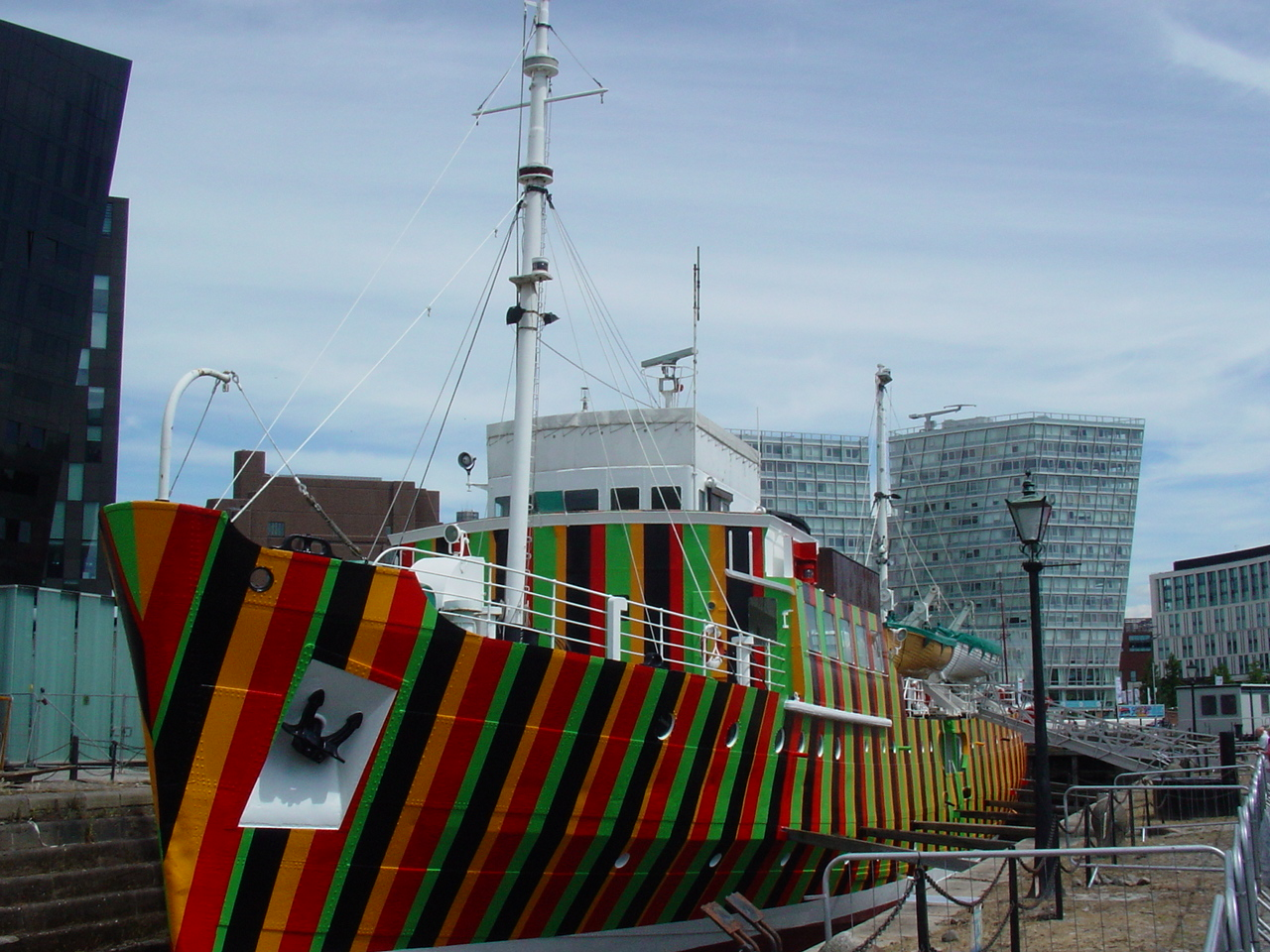
MV Edmund Gardner in dazzle livery

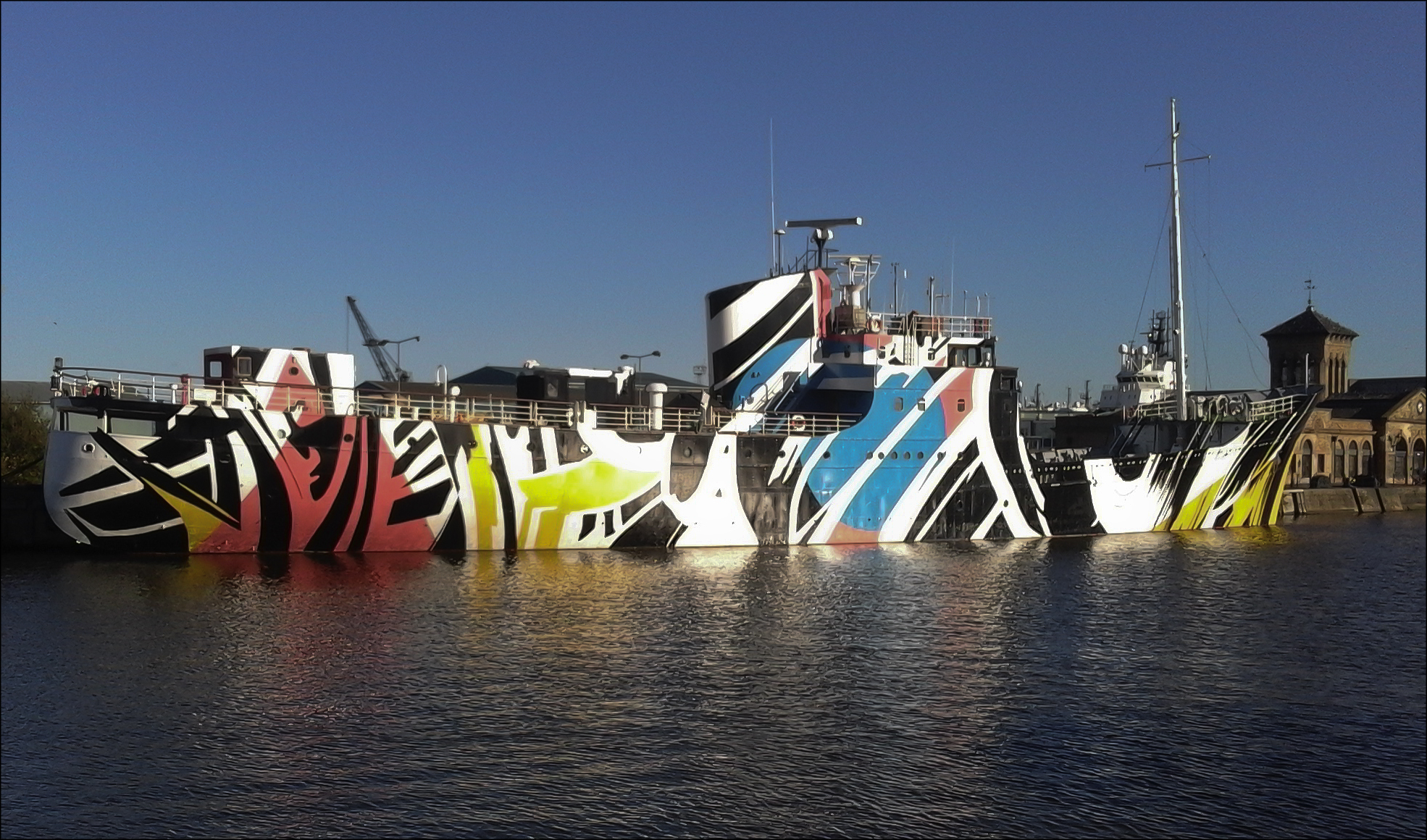
MV Fingal painted in a dazzle pattern, 2016

Dazzle camouflage involved covering a ship's hull with bespoke geometric patterns in contrasting colours with the aim of confusing, or “dazzling” an enemies range-finding efforts and rendering the ship less liable to be hit by torpedo or shell.

Each pattern was unique to the ship for which it was designed, and tested in miniature form on models of the ship being treated. More than 400 warships and 4000 merchant vessels were thus painted by the end of the conflict.

The dazzle artwork ships are three vessels (joined later by a fourth), each covered with an artist-designed livery commissioned by the Imperial War Museum's 14–18 NOW project. These are:-

- “Everybody Razzle Dazzle”, by Peter Blake, installed on the Mersey ferryboat Snowdrop, and seen in operation on the River Mersey.
- “Dazzle Ship London”, by Tobias Rehberger, on HMS President on the River Thames.
- “Induction Chromatique à Double Fréquence”, by Carlos Cruz-Diez, on the museum ship Edmund Gardner, in Liverpool's Canning graving dock.
- “Every Woman”, by Ciara Phillips. Added in 2016 to MV Fingal in the Prince Alexander Dock, Leith.

Work was started in preparation for the centenary of the outbreak of World War I in August 2014. While the artworks have been inspired by the First World War dazzle camouflage patterns, the brief has been widely interpreted in each case, and they bear little resemblance to the original dazzle designs.

== See also ==
- Lozenge camouflage
