= MV Edmund Gardner =

Coordinates: 53.402665°N 2.993578°W

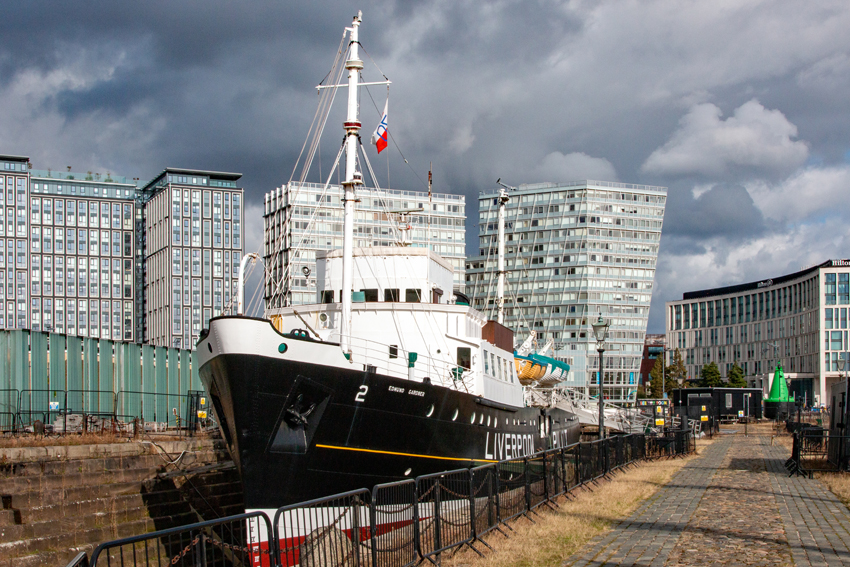
- Edmund Gardner in Canning Dock

History

United Kingdom
- Name: MV Edmund Gardner
- Namesake: Edmund Gardner, chairman
- Owner: Mersey Docks and Harbour Board
- Operator: Liverpool Pilotage Authority
- Port of registry: Liverpool
- Ordered: July 1951
- Builder: Philip and Son, Dartmouth
- Cost: £189,230
- Launched: 9 July 1953
- Acquired: 2 December 1953
- Out of service: April 1981
- Identification: IMO number: 5097228; Callsign: GRCX
- Status: Museum ship

General characteristics
- Tonnage: 701 gross register tons (GRT)
- Displacement: 768.36 tonnes
- Length: 54.1 metres (177 ft)
- Beam: 9.6 metres (31 ft)
- Draught: 3.1 metres (10 ft) for'd: 3.7 metres (12 ft) aft
- Installed power: 1280 bhp
- Propulsion: Diesel-electric: 2x 6cyl, 640bhp National diesel engines
- Speed: 14 knots (26 km/h; 16 mph)
- Crew: 54, including; 32 pilots; 11 apprentices
- Notes: Boats carried: 2x5.8 metres (19 ft) motor launches; 2x8.2 metres (27 ft) oared boats

MV Edmund Gardner is a retired pilot cutter built for the Liverpool Pilot Service after the Second World War. She was decommissioned after nearly 30 years service converted to a museum ship as part of the Merseyside Maritime Museum.

== Service career ==
Edmund Gardner was ordered by the Mersey Docks and Harbour Board in July 1951 as a replacement for the pre-war steam powered cutters which were nearing the end of their usefulness.

Edmund Gardner (cutter no.2) was one of three such vessels, each being named for a past chairman of the board. Her sister-ships were Thomas Brocklebank (cutter no.1) and Arnet Robinson (cutter no.3)

Edmund Gardner was built by Philip and Son, of Dartmouth, and was launched on 9 July 1953. She was completed and entered service on the Mersey on 2 December 1953.

Her function was to serve as a floating base for pilots guiding ships into and out of the Mersey. She would remain one week at the Liverpool Bar, followed by one week at Point Lynas, Anglesey, and then serve one week as supply ship to the other two. While on station her function was to meet ships entering the Mersey en route to the Liverpool Docks or the Manchester Ship Canal, and transfer the pilot for the transit of the waterway, or to collect pilots from outgoing vessels. During that period the Mersey was still a busy waterway; On an average day, such as 15 April 1960, Edmund Gardner met and transferred pilots for 16 ships (10 inbound and 6 outbound) in one 8-hour period.

During her 28 years of successful service Edmund Gardner suffered only one incident; in 1963 she was involved in a mild collision with ore carrier Iron Horse, but suffered no serious damage.

== Later history ==
In April 1981 Edmund Gardner was de-commissioned; in 1982 she was purchased for the museum, one of only two such ships in preservation. Today she is located in the Canning Graving Dock, across the dock from the Maritime Museum and adjacent to the Museum of Liverpool Life.

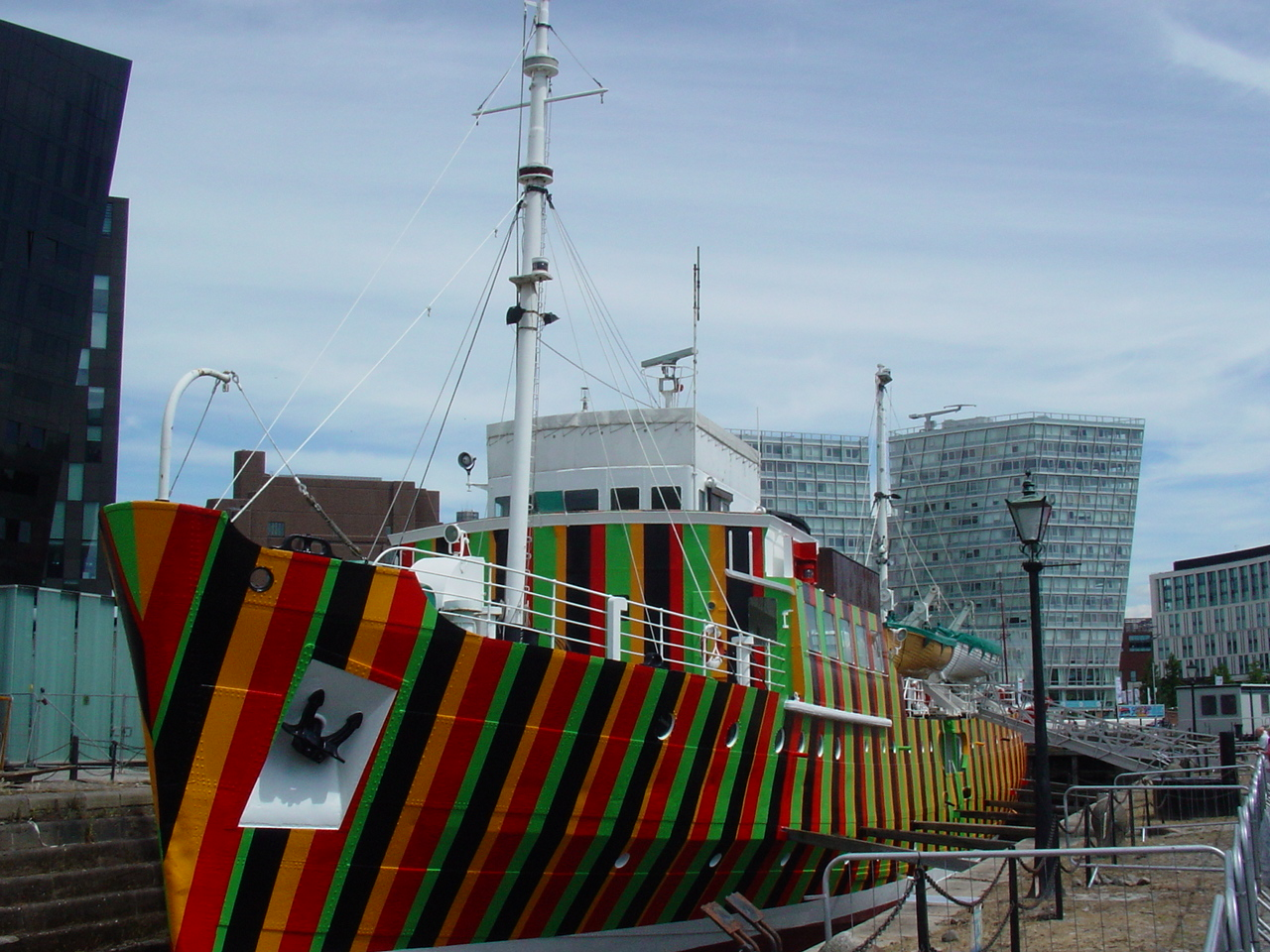
Edmund Gardner in "dazzle" paint scheme

In 2014 Edmund Gardner was selected for use as a "dazzle ship", an art installation organized by the Imperial War Museum's 14-18 NOW project. In conjunction with Liverpool Biennial and Tate Liverpool, Edmund Gardner was re-painted with a design by artist Carlos Cruz-Diez entitled Induction Chromatique à Double Fréquence, and inspired by the dazzle camouflage developed and used during the First World War. The installation incorporated previously unreleased music by Orchestral Manoeuvres in the Dark, dating to the sessions for Dazzle Ships (1983). It was played in the vessel's engine room.
