= Saxifrage (disambiguation) =

Saxifrage or Saxifraga a plant genus.

Saxifrage may also refer to:

== Other plants ==
- Chondrosea cotyledon, pyramidal saxifrage
- Pimpinella saxifraga, burnet saxifrage
- Chrysosplenium, the golden-saxifrages
- Silaum silaus, the pepper-Saxifrage

== Others ==
- HMS Saxifrage, two Royal Navy ships
- Operation Saxifrage, a World War II military operation
- Saxifrage "Sax" Russell, a character in Kim Stanley Robinson's Mars trilogy
- Saxifraga Mountain, a mountain in the Ilgachuz Range of British Columbia

== See also ==
- Sassafras, plant whose name may have the same origin
