= HMS Saxifrage =

Two ships of the Royal Navy were named HMS Saxifrage after the genus of holarctic perennial plants:

- HMS Saxifrage (1918), an Anchusa-class sloop launched in 1918 and renamed HMS President in 1922, becoming a Royal Naval Reserve drill ship on the River Thames. She was sold in 1988, passing through a series of private owners and is used as a venue for conferences and functions.
- HMS Saxifrage (K04), a Flower-class corvette launched in 1942 and transferred in August 1947 to Royal Norwegian Navy as the weather ship Polarfront I. She was scrapped in 1979.
