= HMS Bryony (1917) =

Royal Navy ship

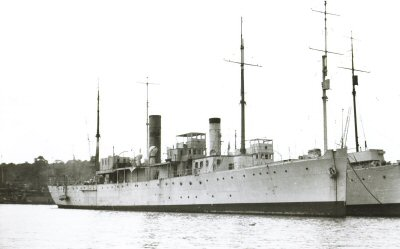

History

United Kingdom
- Name: HMS Bryony
- Ordered: 21 February 1917
- Builder: Armstrong Whitworth
- Launched: 27 October 1917
- Fate: Sold for breaking up on 3 April 1938

General characteristics
- Class & type: Anchusa-class sloop
- Displacement: 1,290 tons
- Length: 250 ft (76 m) (p/p), 262.25 ft (79.93 m)(overall)
- Beam: 35 ft (11 m)
- Draught: 11 ft 6 in (3.51 m) (mean); 12 ft 6 in (3.81 m) - 13 ft 8 in (4.17 m) (deep)
- Propulsion: One screw, 4-cylinder triple expansion; Two boilers; 2,500 hp (1,900 kW)
- Speed: 16 knots (30 km/h; 18 mph)
- Range: Coal: 260 tons
- Complement: 93
- Armament: 2 × QF 4-inch Mk IV guns or BL 4-inch Mk IX guns; 2 × 12-pounder guns; 4 x depth charge throwers

HMS Bryony was an Anchusa-class sloop of the Royal Navy, built at the yards of Armstrong Whitworth and launched on 27 October 1917.

She was used to escort convoys during the First World War, and in common with other ships of her class, was disguised as a merchant vessel, known as a Q-ship. After the war she remained in service with the Royal Navy and between 7 April 1933 and January 1934, she was commanded by Bernard Warburton-Lee, later to posthumously be awarded a Victoria Cross in the Second World War.

She was decommissioned before the outbreak of the Second World War and was sold on 3 April 1938 to Cashmore, of Newport, Monmouthshire to be broken up.
