= Anchusa-class sloop =

Sloops built under the Emergency War Programme during World War 1

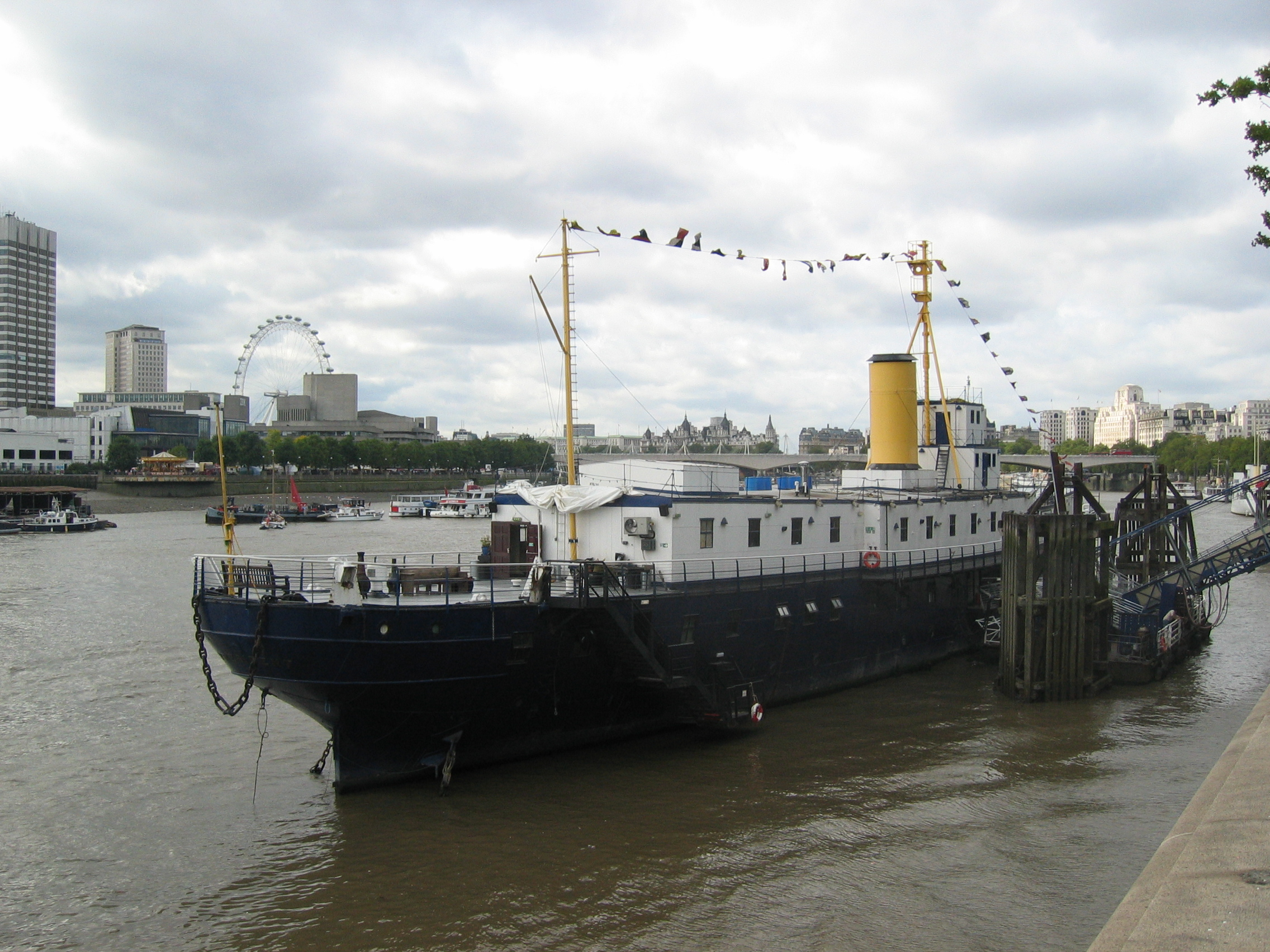
- HMS President on the Thames

Class overview
- Name: Flower class, Anchusa type
- Operators: Royal Navy
- Preceded by: Cadmus class
- Succeeded by: Kil class
- In service: 1988
- In commission: 1917
- Completed: 28
- Lost: 6
- Preserved: 1

General characteristics
- Type: Convoy escort Q-Ship: ("Warship-Q")
- Displacement: 1,290 long tons (1,311 t)
- Length: 250 ft (76.2 m) p/p; 262 ft 3 in (79.93 m) o/a
- Beam: 35 ft (10.7 m)
- Draught: 11 ft 6 in (3.51 m) mean; 12 ft 6 in (3.81 m) – 13 ft 8 in (4.17 m) deep
- Propulsion: 4-cylinder triple expansion engine, 2 boilers, 2,500 hp (1,864 kW), 1 screw
- Speed: 16 knots (29.6 km/h; 18.4 mph)
- Range: Coal: 260 tons
- Complement: 93
- Armament: Designed to mount : 2 × 12-pounder gun; 1 × 7.5 in (191 mm) howitzer or 1 × 200 lb stick-bomb howitzer; 4 × Depth charge throwers; As built: 2 × QF 4 inch Mk IV guns or BL 4 inch Mk IX guns; 1 or 2 × 12-pounder guns; Depth charge throwers

The twenty-eight Anchusa-class sloops were built under the Emergency War Programme for the Royal Navy in World War I as the final part of the larger "Flower class", which were also referred to as the "Cabbage class", or "Herbaceous Borders".

They were single screw fleet sweeping vessels (sloops) with triple hulls at the bow to give extra protection against loss when minesweeping.

The Anchusa class of corvettes or convoy sloops were completed in 1917 and 1918. They were a small class of convoy protection ships built to look like merchant ships for use as Q-ships in World War I.

Two members of the Anchusa group, HMS Chrysanthemum and HMS Saxifrage (renamed HMS President in 1922), survived to be moored on the River Thames for use as Drill Ships by the RNVR until 1988, a total of seventy years in RN service. HMS President (1918) was sold and preserved, and is now one of the last three surviving warships of the Royal Navy built during the First World War, (along with the 1914 Light cruiser HMS Caroline in Belfast, and the 1915 Monitor HMS M33 in Portsmouth dockyard).

== Ships ==
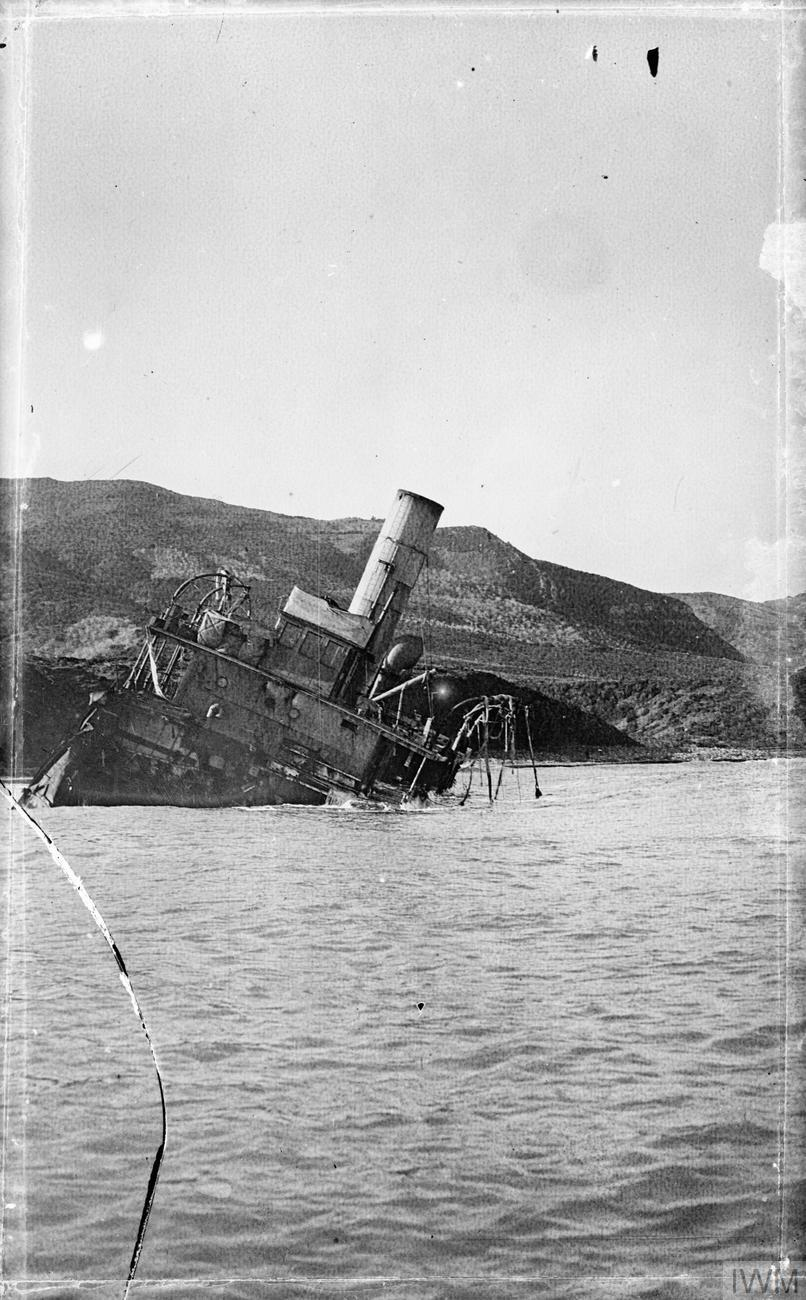
Candytuft sinking, November 1917

These ships were Q-ships, which were disguised as normal mercantile shipping within convoys.

Six ships were ordered on 1 January 1917:

- Anchusa, built by Sir W. G. Armstrong Whitworth and Company, Walker on Tyne, launched 21 April 1917. Sunk by the German submarine U-54 off the west coast of Ireland 16 July 1918.
- Bergamot, built by Armstrong Whitworth, launched 5 May 1917. Sunk by the German submarine U-84 in the Atlantic 13 August 1917.
- Candytuft, built by Armstrong Whitworth, launched 19 May 1917. Torpedoed by submarine 18 November 1917 and stranded near Bougie, Algeria.
- Ceanothus, built by Armstrong Whitworth, launched 2 June 1917. Transferred to Royal Indian Marine in May 1922, and renamed Elphinstone; wrecked on Nicobar Islands 29 January 1925.
- Convolvulus, built by Barclay Curle and Company, Whiteinch, launched 19 May 1917. Sold for breaking up 1 December 1921.
- Eglantine, built by Barclay Curle, launched 22 June 1917. Sold for breaking up 1 December 1921.

Two more ships were ordered on 15 January 1917:

- Spiraea, built by William Simons and Company, Renfrew, launched 1 November 1917. Sold for breaking up 6 September 1922.
- Syringa, built by Workman, Clark and Company, Belfast, launched 29 September 1917. Sold to Egypt 31 March 1920 and renamed Sollum.

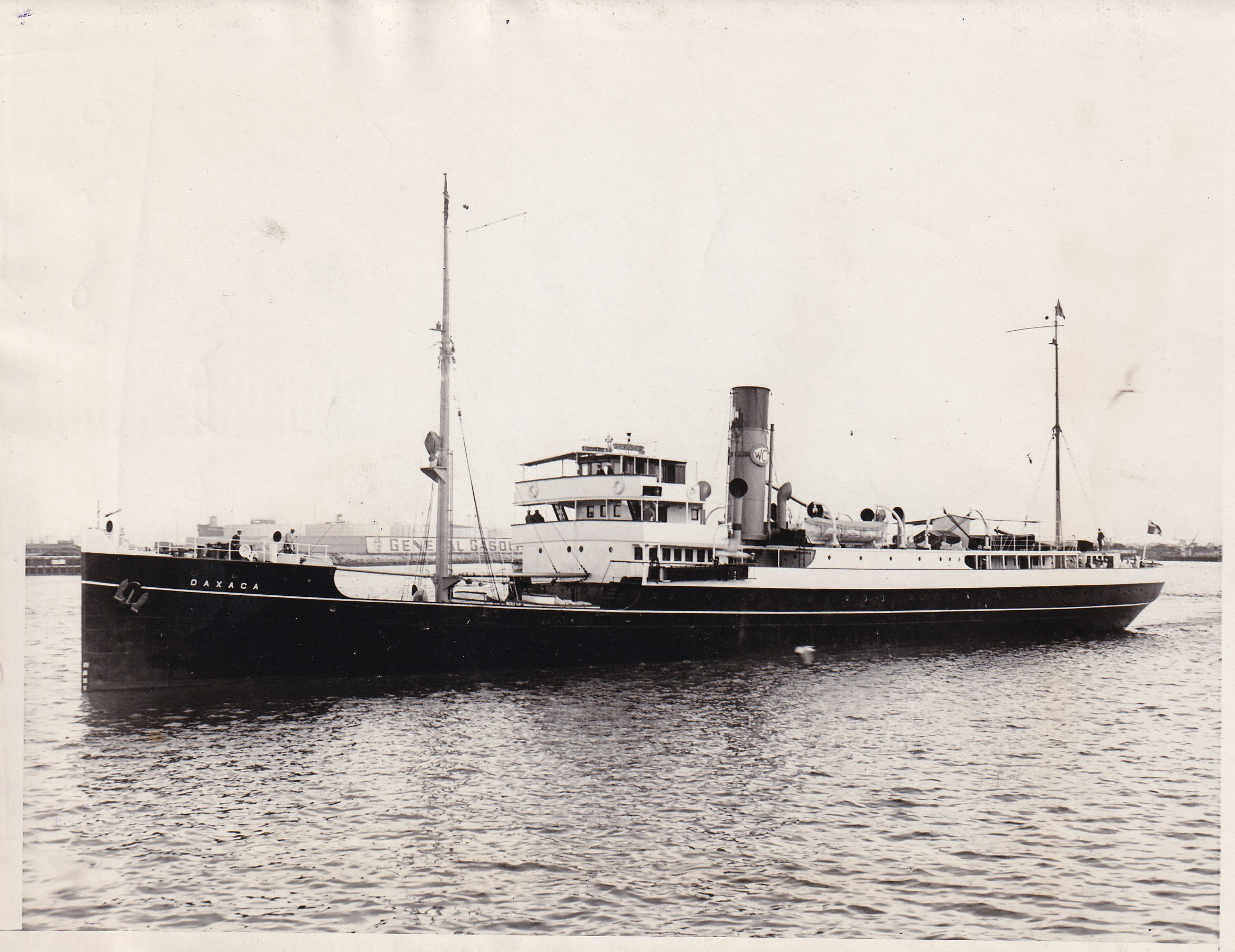
Pelargonium was converted into the private yacht Oaxaca for California millionaire G. Allan Hancock

Twenty more ships were ordered on 21 February 1917:

- Arbutus, built by Armstrong Whitworth, launched 8 September 1917. Sunk by the German submarine UB-65 in the St. George's Channel 16 December 1917.
- Auricula, built by Armstrong Whitworth, launched 4 October 1917. Sold for breaking up 1 February 1923.
- Bryony, built by Armstrong Whitworth, launched 27 October 1917. Sold for breaking up 3 April 1938.
- Chrysanthemum, built by Armstrong Whitworth, launched 10 November 1917. Target towing vessel in May 1920. Transferred to Royal Naval Volunteer Reserve 1938, and stationed on the Embankment in London; broken up 1995.
- Coreopsis, built by Barclay Curle, launched 15 September 1917. Sold for breaking up 6 September 1922.
- Cowslip, built by Barclay Carle, launched 19 October 1917. Sunk by the German submarine UB-105 off Cape Spartel 25 April 1918.
- Dianthus, built by Barclay Curle, launched 1 December 1917. Sold to Mexican State Line 3 June 1921, became mercantile Guerrero.
- Gardenia, built by Barclay Curle, launched 27 December 1917. Sold for breaking up 15 January 1923.
- Gilia, built by Barclay Curle, launched 15 March 1918. Sold for breaking up 15 January 1923.
- Harebell, built by Barclay Curle, launched 10 May 1918. Sold for breaking up in February 1939.
- Ivy, built by Blyth Shipbuilding and Dry Dock Company, Blyth, launched 31 October 1917. Sold February 1920 and resold 2 June 1921, became mercantile Sinaloa (Clan Line).
- Marjoram, built by Greenock & Grangemouth Dockyard Company, launched 26 December 1917. Intended to become RNVR drill ship President, but was wrecked in January 1921 off Flintstone Head while en route to fit out at Haulbowline.
- Mistletoe, built by Greenock & Grangemouth, launched 17 November 1917. Sold 25 January 1921, became mercantile Chiapas (Clan Line).
- Pelargonium, built by William Hamilton & Company, Port Glasgow, launched 18 March 1918. Sold 25 January 1921, became mercantile Oaxaca (Clan Line).
- Rhododendron, built by Irvine's Shipbuilding and Dry Dock Company, West Hartlepool. Sunk by the German submarine U-70 in the North Sea 5 May 1918.
- Saxifrage, built by Lobnitz and Company, Renfrew, launched 29 January 1918. Became RNVR drill ship 1921, and stationed on the Embankment in London; renamed President in July 1922, in private hands since 1988.
- Silene, built by William Simons and Company, Renfrew, launched 12 March 1918. Sold for breaking up 29 December 1921.
- Sweetbriar, built by Swan Hunter and Wigham Richardson, Wallsend on Tyne, launched 5 October 1917. Sold for breaking up 7 October 1927.
- Tuberose, built by Swan Hunter, launched 16 November 1917. Sold for breaking up 15 January 1923.
- Windflower, built by Workman, Clark & Company, Belfast, launched 12 April 1918. Sold for breaking up 7 October 1927.

== See also ==
- Media related to Anchusa class sloop at Wikimedia Commons
