= Recomposing Earth =

- Directed by: Christian Cargill
- Produced by: Christian Cargill; John Bannister
- Starring: Erland Cooper; Marta Salogni; Paul Weller; Sir Ian Rankin
- Cinematography: Christian Cargill
- Edited by: Kevin Corry
- Music by: Erland Cooper
- Production company: Dalmatian Films
- Release date: June 2024 (Barbican Hall)
- Country: United Kingdom
- Language: English

Recomposing Earth is a 2024 short documentary film about Scottish composer Erland Cooper’s buried album project on the Orkney Islands. Directed and produced by Christian Cargill, the film had its world premiere at London's Barbican Hall in June 2024 before its International festival run. The documentary has won multiple awards, including Best Documentary Short at Flickerfest, Bolton Film Festival & This Is England Film Festival.

== Synopsis ==
Recomposing Earth follows the unique story of composer Erland Cooper, who in 2021 buried the only existing recording of his unreleased album Carve the Runes Then Be Content With Silence on a hillside in Orkney. The documentary follows the evolving story of the album being discovered by local Orcadian residents, to see if the album had eventually been destroyed. The film explores themes relating to the value we place on art, music's importance on the human condition and an appreciation of silence in today's world.
