= The Magnetic North =

British band

- Origin: London, England, Orkney
- Genres: Shoegaze, post-rock
- Label: Full Time Hobby
- Members: Simon Tong; Gawain Erland Cooper; Hannah Peel
- Website: Official website

The Magnetic North are a British band, formed between multi-instrumentalist Simon Tong, Orcadian artist and producer Gawain Erland Cooper and singer, composer and orchestral arranger Hannah Peel. Their songs are part autobiography and part psychogeography.

Having come together to make an album that imagined the landscape, legends and people of Gawain Erland Cooper's birthplace, Orkney (2012's highly acclaimed Orkney: Symphony of the Magnetic North), and originally intending to be a one-off, led them to reconvene to release follow-up Prospect of Skelmersdale in 2016 – evoking childhood memory, people and place, and an examination of how a failing Northern new town became home to the transcendental meditation movement. If Orkney was the musical equivalent of great nature writing then Prospect of Skelmersdale is somewhere between finely-tuned kitchen-sink drama and urban psychogeography. Inspired as much by the greys and greens of Kes, as the cyclical patterns of meditative ragas, Prospect of Skelmersdale is a collection of musical snapshots of a British town.

It is a concept album about Tong's Transcendentalist hometown, Skelmersdale. In an interview with Transverso Media he described it as, "a series of little snapshots that I had drawn from my memory of people and places," stating it's, "kind of about where I grew up. I’m kind of wondering what the people of that town will think about it – whether they’ll like it or they won’t like it. I don’t know."

The inspiration for Orkney: Symphony of the Magnetic North was the appearance in a dream of Betty Corrigall to Cooper, insisting that he should write an album about his island home.

== Personnel ==
- Simon Tong
- Gawain Erland Cooper
- Hannah Peel

== Discography ==
- 2012: Orkney: Symphony of the Magnetic North
- 2016: Prospect of Skelmersdale
