= Erland and the Carnival =

British progressive folk rock band

Erland & The Carnival

Background information
- Origin: London, England
- Genres: Alternative; folk; folk-rock
- Years active: 2009–present
- Labels: Full Time Hobby; Static Caravan Recordings
- Members: Simon Tong; Gawain Erland Cooper; David Nock; Andrew Bruce; Danny Wheeler

Erland & The Carnival were a British progressive folk rock band, formed in London, by Orcadian folk guitarist and singer Gawain Erland Cooper, multi-instrumentalist Simon Tong, and drummer/engineer David Nock. In 2010 they released their critically acclaimed eponymous debut album, and a year later released Nightingale to further widespread acclaim. Their third album Closing Time was released in autumn 2014 and featured collaborations with Paul Weller. The album was recorded in 7 days at Damon Albarn's Studio 13 and was mixed by Tim Bran.

Erland & The Carnival are well known for their contemporary arrangements of traditional Scottish and English folk songs, resulting in a "wild pastiche of digital trickery and oral tradition that channels the spirit of '70s progressive rock while staying true to pop-song brevity."

== History ==
=== Founding, early releases ===
The band Erland & The Carnival was formed in London in 2009, by multi-instrumentalist Simon Tong, Orcadian folk guitarist and singer Gawain Erland Cooper and drummer/engineer David Nock.

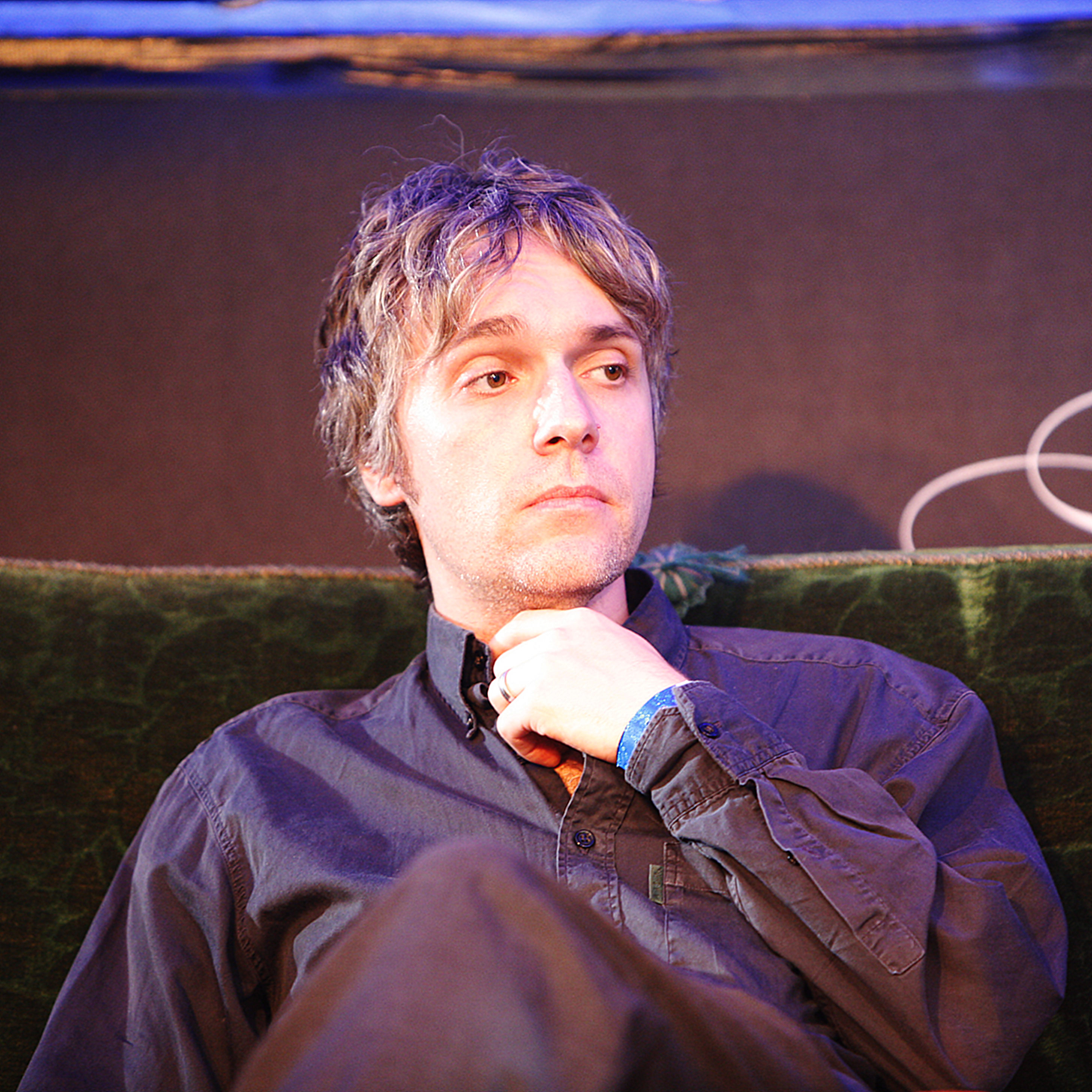
Simon Tong in 2007, shortly before the founding of the band

Erland Cooper and Tong had first met at a London folk night put on by Tong in 2008, and discovered a shared love of folk music and musician Jackson C. Frank, and in particular Frank's song "My Name is Carnival," which became the basis for the band's name. According to Tong, "[Cooper and I] did an afternoon of playing and writing with engineer and drummer friend David Nock and pretty much decided there and then to form a band." Instead of rock and folk, Nock came from an electronic background, contributing to their unique sound.

After Erland and Nock recorded the track "Coming Home" for Tong and Youth's compilation What the Folk (Vol 2), the three began writing and playing together around London. Musicians Andrew Bruce and Danny Wheeler joined later as permanent members, with Bruce on synthesizers and Wheeler handling bass guitar.

Inspired by Daniel Johnston's Hello How Are You? (on which he re-recorded individual albums to meet demand because his tape machine was broken), Erland and the Carnival released a limited edition debut EP in September 2008, with each CD containing different recordings unique to each copy.

=== Erland and the Carnival (2010) ===
The band's debut album, Erland & the Carnival was recorded at Damon Albarn's Studio 13 and released on 25 January 2010. A number of traditional songs are used by the band, including "The Derby Ram" by Llewellyn Jewitt, with the band changing the lyrics to refer to a suicide which occurred in Derby in 2008.

The album was received favourably by publications such as The Times and The Guardian, and the album's lead single, "Erland & The Carnival," was named track of the day by Clash Magazine on 28 January 2010.

According to the BBC, the band has "taken various bits of existing poetry, lyrics, folk tales and songs, and melded them together with their own organs, guitars and lyrics. The result is a collection of engaging, swirling tracks and stories that sound like the soundtrack to a creepy, dreamy funfair." For Folks Sake praised the production quality, stating "the crystal clarity and spatial acumen in the recording of the instrumentation and vocals is a brilliant work of dissection."

=== EPs, singles ===
Their Trouble in Mind EP was released on Yep Roc in the US and Full Time Hobby in the UK on 19 October 2010. Their promo single from the EP, "The Derby Ram," was released on Full Time Hobby during the week of 20 August 2010. According to a review of the album by Pop Matters, who gave the album 6/10 stars, "Weaving psychedelic choral interludes out of the Electric Prunes' Mass in F Minor with early Jefferson Airplane and occasional Tom Waits madness, the band's sound is very, very unusual...just don't expect strong melodies or pop hooks on this one; that's not their aim."

The band has toured frequently, both in England and internationally, and played venues such as SXSW in 2011. The band has toured with artists such as Hannah Peel.

=== Nightingale (2011) ===
Nightingale is their second studio album, released in 2011 on the Full Time Hobby label. The band spent over a year writing the songs for the album, and the recording process took around three months. The album was recorded on board HMS President, a ship moored on the River Thames.

Whereas their previous album was replete with allusions to old ballads, Nightingale consists primarily of original tracks. On its cover is a photo of Janet Hodgson flying across her bedroom, supposedly by a poltergeist. The band claims the art reflects the album's sound, as they were "trying to create a soundtrack to an imaginary horror film about the supernatural."

The album received positive reviews from Allmusic and The Times, and a positive review and 3/5 stars from The Guardian. A review by Pitchfork was largely positive. According to James Monger of Allmusic, "The group takes traditional folk music and then filters it through the swirling psych rock of Piper at the Gates of Dawn-era Pink Floyd, the electro-freak folk of Animal Collective, and the pastoral creep of bands Espers and Vetiver, resulting in a wild pastiche of digital trickery and oral tradition that channels the spirit of '70s progressive rock while staying true to pop-song brevity."

=== Rufus ===
The band contributed several songs to the soundtrack of the 2012 Canadian film Rufus. The songs "Wanting" and "Out of Sight" received Canadian Screen Award nominations for Best Original Song at the 1st Canadian Screen Awards.

== Style, themes ==
Erland and the Carnival became known for their contemporary arrangements of traditional Scottish and English folk songs, including "Tramps and Hawkers", "Was You Ever See" and "Love Is a Killing Thing", collected by Ralph Vaughan Williams. Many of the songs are rooted in scholarship; before forming the band, Erland Cooper had previously spent years studying Bert Jansch and Davey Graham, sourcing old British songs from the Vaughan Williams museum near where he lives.

According to the band, their approach to the music is more casual than serious, and "we collect ideas from films, books, car boot sales and art. When we were recording the album in our boat studio...we would visit the Tate Britain art gallery each morning for ideas. Artists like Mike Nelson, Susan Hiller and of course Grayson Perry were a great inspiration."

The track "Everything Came Too Easy" was inspired by a speech by Charles Van Doren to the House Subcommittee on Legislative Oversight, a United States Congress subcommittee, investigating a rigging scandal on the quiz show Twenty One. The track "The Derby Ram" is a modernisation of a folk standard about a giant fictional sheep, reworked to comment on the suicide of Shaun Dykes.

== Band members ==
- Simon Tong – Guitar, harmonium, zither, backing vocals
- Gawain Erland Cooper – Guitar, vocals
- David Nock – Drums, percussion, backing vocals, keyboards
- Andy Bruce – Synthesizers
- Danny Wheeler – Bass guitar

== Discography ==
=== Albums ===
List of studio and live albums
Year	Album title	UK charts		Release details	Certifications
Year	Album title	Indie		Release details	Certifications
2009	Was You Ever See EP	—	—	Released: 9 October 2009; Label: Static Caravan; Format: CD, digital	
2010	Erland & the Carnival	—	—	Released: 25 January 2010; Label: Full Time Hobby/Static Caravan; Format: CD, digital	The Times: Drowned in Sound: 7/10
2010	Trouble in Mind EP	—	—	Released: 19 October 2010 (US/UK); Label: Full Time Hobby/Yep Roc; Format: Vinyl, digital	PopMatters: 6/10
2011	Nightingale	21	—	Released: 7 March 2011; Label: Full Time Hobby; Format: CD, digital	The Times: Allmusic: The Guardian:
2014	Closing Time		—	Released: 25 August 2014; Label: Full Time Hobby; Format: Vinyl, CD, digital	
"—" denotes a recording that did not chart or was not released in that territory.

=== Singles ===
Incomplete list of songs
Year	Title	Album	Notes
2010	"The Derby Ram"	Erland & the Carnival/Single-only (Full Time Hobby, 20 August 2010)	
2010	"Trouble in Mind"	Trouble in Mind EP	Music video
2010	"Don't Have to Be Lonely"	Trouble in Mind EP	
2010	"Carnilvisation "	Single-only (self-released)	7" tour vinyl
2011	"Map of an Englishman"	Nightingale/Single-only (Full Time Hobby)	7" vinyl, CDr, music video
2011	"Springtime"	Nightingale/Single-only (Full Time Hobby)	CDr
