= HMS Bergamot (1917) =

Minesweeper of the Royal Navy

History

United Kingdom
- Name: HMS Bergamot
- Namesake: Bergamot
- Builder: Armstrong Whitworth
- Laid down: 1 January 1917
- Launched: 5 May 1917
- Commissioned: 14 July 1917
- Fate: Sunk, by torpedo, 13 August 1917 in position 55°13′N 10°17′W

General characteristics
- Class & type: Anchusa-class sloop
- Displacement: 1,290 long tons (1,311 t)
- Length: 250 ft (76 m) p/p; 262 ft 3 in (79.93 m) o/a
- Beam: 35 ft (11 m)
- Draught: 11 ft 6 in (3.51 m) mean; 12 ft 6 in (3.81 m) – 13 ft 8 in (4.17 m) deep
- Propulsion: 4-cylinder triple expansion engine; 2 boilers; 2,500 hp (1,864 kW); 1 screw
- Speed: 16 knots (30 km/h; 18 mph)
- Range: 260 long tons (260 t) coal
- Complement: 92
- Armament: 2 × QF 4 inch Mk IV guns or BL 4 inch Mk IX guns; 2 × 12-pounder guns; Depth charge throwers

HMS Bergamot was an Anchusa-class sloop of the Royal Navy, which had a short career during World War I. Built by Armstrong Whitworth, the ship was laid down on 1 January 1917, launched on 5 May, and commissioned on 14 July.

Four weeks later, on 13 August 1917, under the command of Lieut-Commander Percy T. Perkins, she was sunk in the Atlantic 70 nautical miles (130 km) north-west of the harbour of Killybegs by the German submarine U-84, commanded by Walter Rohr.

== Sinking ==
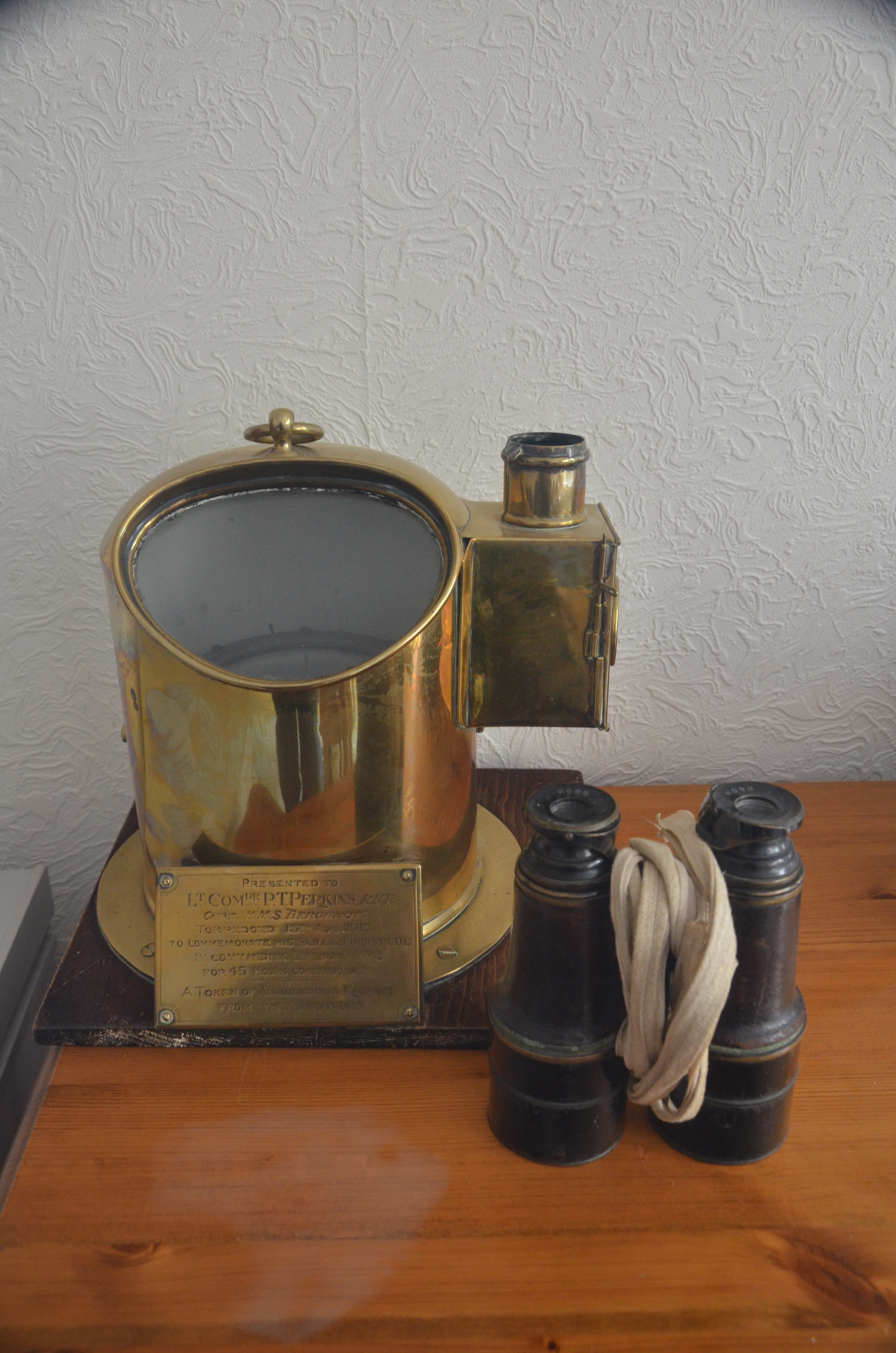
The only two known artefacts from HMS Bergamot. The binnacle from no.2 lifeboat, and the binoculars worn by Signalman Bill Jones at the moment the torpedo struck, and retained by him throughout the subsequent lifeboat voyage.

His war diary describes how he sighted a lone merchant ship, with no defensive armament (an unusual sight by 1917). Bergamot evidently sighted the U-boat's periscope, as she began to zig-zag at high speed. U-84 fired one torpedo – which hit on the port side – and Bergamot broke in half and sank in four minutes. Surfacing, U-84 sighted an unusually large number of crew (70) and pieces of wood floating. The U-boat's log identifies the possibility of Bergamot being a "trap ship". One of the indicators being the narrow beam in relation to the length of the ship, a sure sign of a warship.

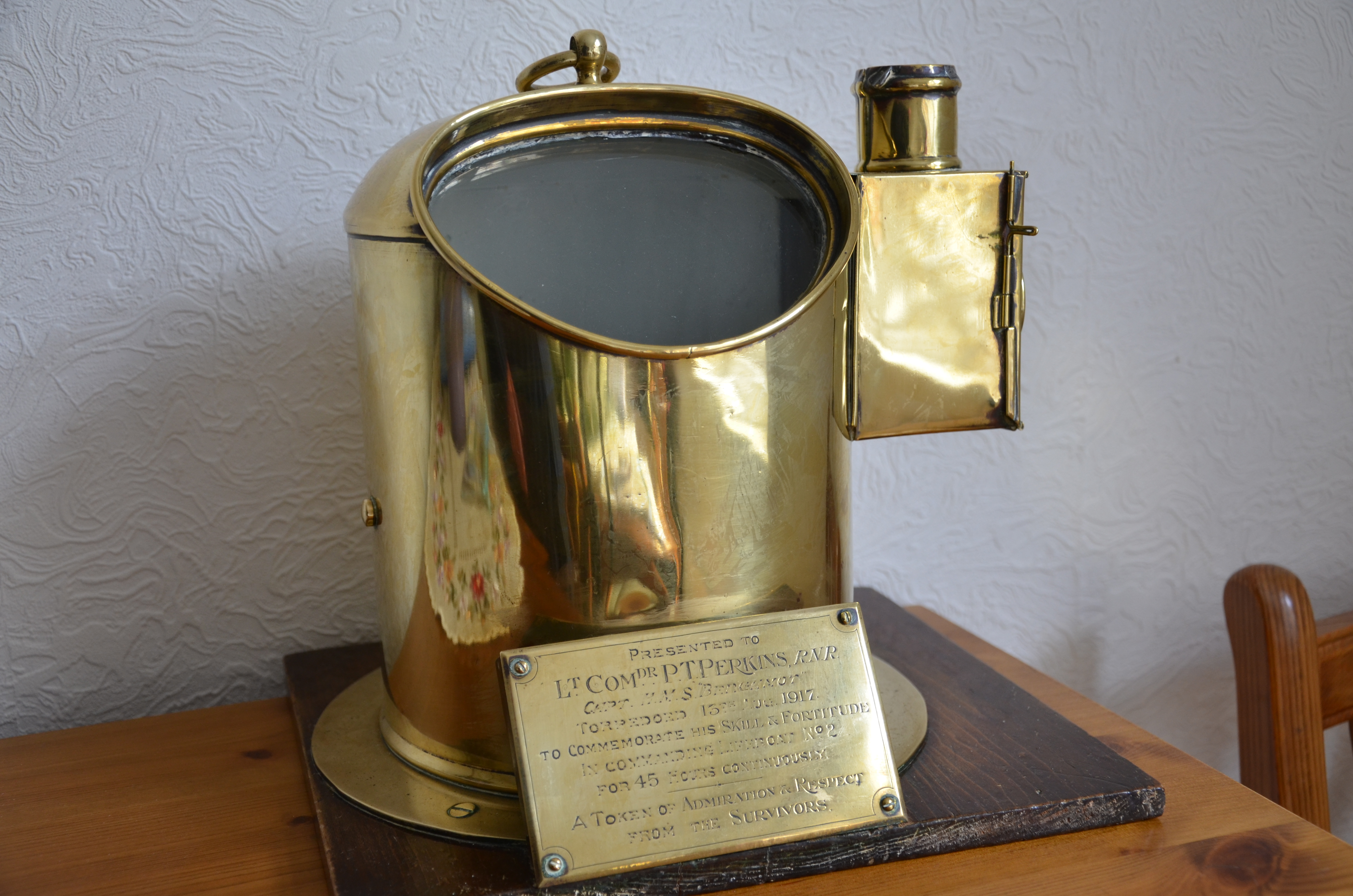
The Bergamot binnacle. The binnacle of lifeboat no.2, HMS Bergamot

The torpedo struck her on the port side at 13 minutes to 9, entering the auxiliary engine room and destroying the dynamo and the bulkhead separating the auxiliary engine room from the main engine room. All the lights went out. Bergamot launched a "panic party" in lifeboat no.1, containing 31 men, but the ship lurched to port, both the bow and stern rising out of the water, and she sank too quickly for the ruse to be successful.

U-84 approached Lifeboat no. 2 and asked where the captain was. They were told, "In the other boat, Sir" although actually he was on a small raft being towed by no.2 at the time. U-84 had both her deck guns trained on the lifeboat, but they believed the story and headed for lifeboat no. 1, now about two miles (3.2 km) away. There, they went close alongside and hauled the ship's steward aboard, probably because he was the only one with a collar and tie on, and looked like an officer. Luckily, he stuck to the cover story, although questioned severely by Rohr as to "where bound, what cargo?" and was told to go back to his lifeboat, after having been given a glass of port wine and a cigarette, and after also transferring a wounded man that the submarine had picked up to the boat. With a cheery, "See you after the war!" the submarine disappeared into the night mists.

At the moment of the explosion, Bergamot's first officer, Lieutenant Frederick W. Siddall, and her probationer surgeon, Robert S. Smith were both in her wardroom. The explosion jammed both of the watertight doors leading into this compartment, and Siddall was rendered unconscious. Smith piled the wrecked wardroom furniture up in order to reach the skylight in the roof, and then dragged the unconscious Siddall up and out of the compartment. Having reached the main deck, Smith worked on both Siddall and a wounded petty officer, who was lying on the deck with a broken leg and arm. By this time the ship was clearly sinking so Smith inflated his casualties life vests and lowered them both into the water.

As Bergamot sank one of her depth charges exploded, badly wounding Siddall and again rendering him unconscious. Smith towed both his casualties to lifeboat no.2, which had left the sinking ship, containing 47 survivors, and then worked on Siddall for 25 minutes, administering artificial respiration, until he again recovered consciousness. Smith then treated the other injured survivors in no.2 over the 48 hours that the lifeboats were adrift until they were picked up. For these life saving actions, Surgeon Robert Sydney Steele Cathcart Smith was awarded the Albert Medal.

The lifeboats became separated through the first night. Lifeboat no.2 with 47 crew on board set course for Loch Swilly, about 100 miles away, They sailed and rowed for three days before being picked up by the Admiralty trawler Lord Lister. Lifeboat no.1 reached the rocky shores of County Donegal where they were taken ashore by the coastguard.

For Smith and Siddall, this was the second time they had been blown up in 6 weeks. They had both been members of the crew on HMS Salvia when that ship had been sunk.

An interesting historical note is that the week before, Bergamot had experimented with towing a submerged submarine – E48 – thus resurrecting a 1915 method of trapping submarines.
