= Betty Corrigall =

Scottish woman found 150 years after her death

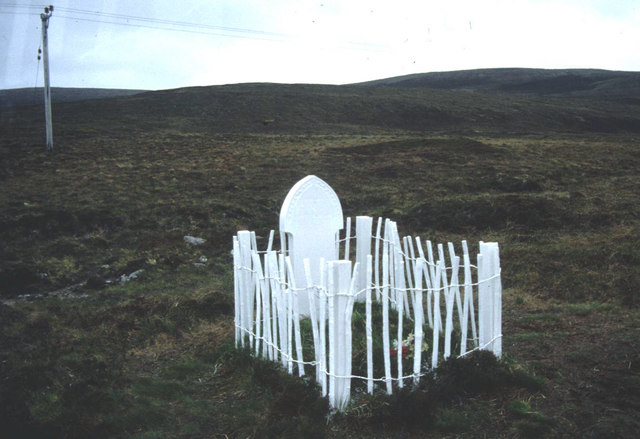
Betty Corrigall's grave

Betty Corrigall (fl.c. 1770) was a Scot whose body was found 150 years after her suicide and burial in an unmarked grave. Her grave is now a popular tourist site on Orkney, and she was the inspiration behind the 2012 album Orkney: Symphony of the Magnetic North by The Magnetic North.

== Life ==
Corrigall lived in Greengairs Cottage near Rysa on Hoy on Orkney in the 1770s. At the age of 27, she had a short romance and became pregnant. Her boyfriend, a whaler by trade, abandoned her and returned to the sea. Betty had little in the way of support. She attempted suicide, but was rescued by local residents. A few days later, a second suicide attempt by hanging was successful.

Due to the laws at the time, the Lairds of Hoy and Melsetter would not allow her to be buried on their property. She was laid to rest outside their boundary in an unmarked grave.

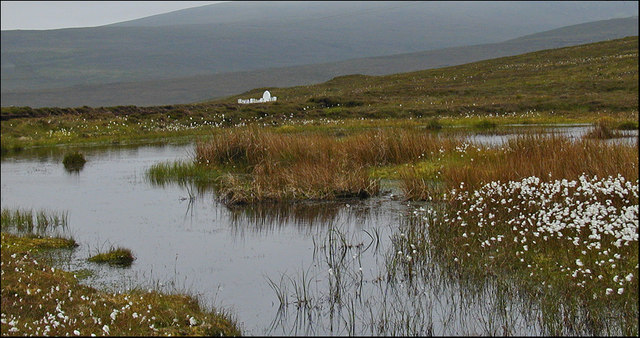
Grave from a distance

== Exhumation and headstone ==
Her body was discovered in either 1933 or 1936 by peat diggers who came across her wooden coffin. Her remains were well preserved in the peat. The procurator fiscal requested that she be buried in the same spot. In 1941, a group of soldiers dug up her body and referred to her as the Lady of Hoy. After this, she was regularly dug up and quickly began to decompose. A concrete slab was therefore placed over the grave.

In 1949, the American minister Reverend Kenwood Bryant visited Hoy and was so moved that he asked Mr. Harry Berry, a customs officer, to create a proper headstone. This eventually happened 27 years later, after Mr. Berry's retirement. However, due to the boggy ground, a stone headstone was unsuitable, and a fibreglass one was erected instead. It reads, "Here lies Betty Corrigall."

Betty's grave is now a popular tourist site.

== In popular culture ==
In 2013, The Magnetic North released their debut album, Orkney: Symphony of the Magnetic North. Founder member Erland Cooper stated that the inspiration for the making of the album was a dream he had, wherein Corrigall insisted he wrote an album about his home.

The Scottish band The Knowe O'Deil (of which Ivan Drever was a member) released an album called Orkney Anthem, which includes the track "Betty Corrigall".

English folk singer-songwriter Reg Meuross wrote a song about Betty Corrigall called "The Dreamed and the Drowned", which is the title track of his 2011 album.

Scottish singer-songwriter Malcolm MacWatt has a song about Betty Corrigall entitled "The Lady Of Hoy" on his 2024 EP 'Stubble And Straw: The Dark Harvest Gleanings'
