= HMS President (1918) =

Minesweeper of the Royal Navy

Coordinates: 51°23′57″N 0°32′42″E

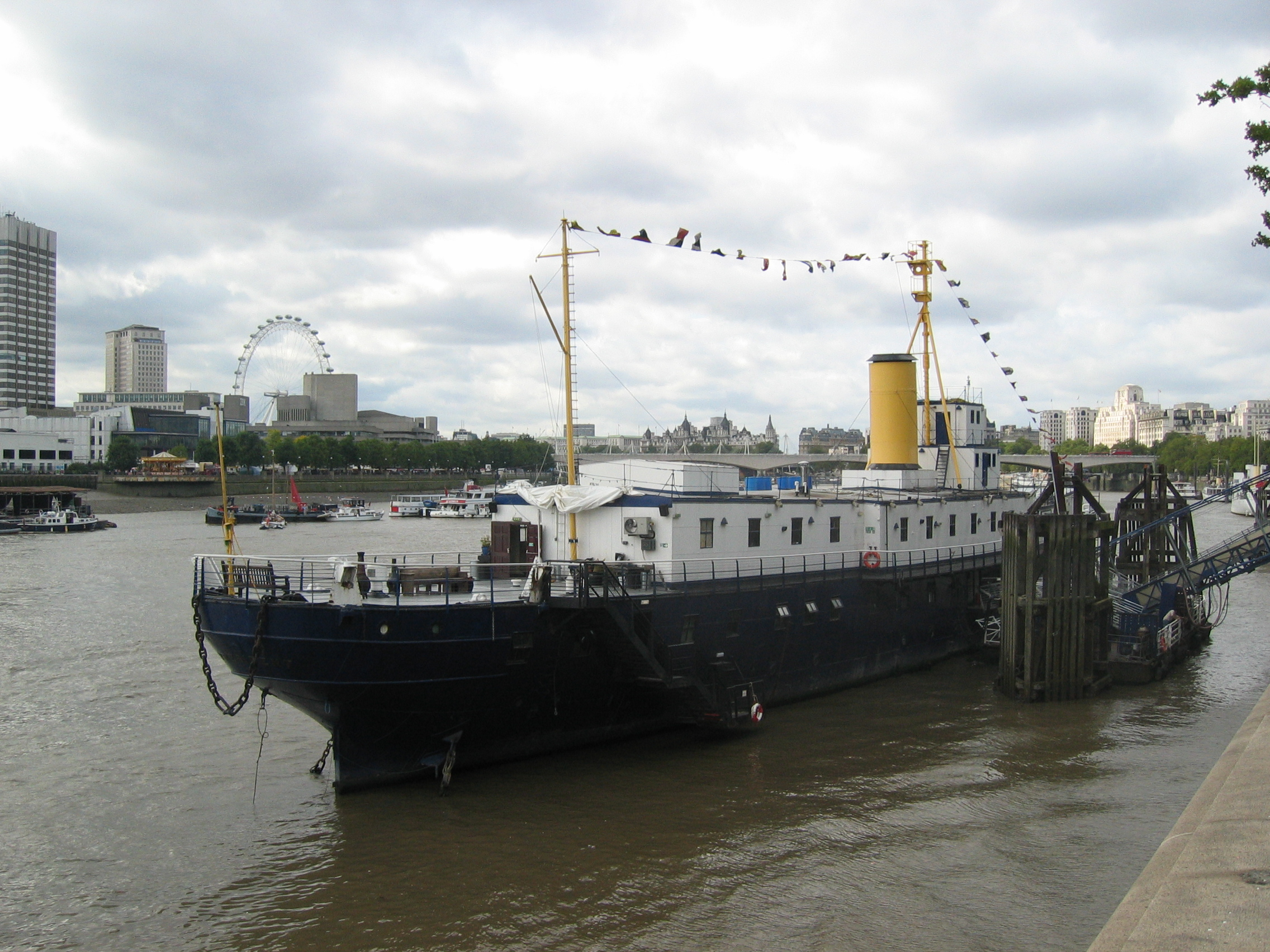
- HMS President in the Thames

History

United Kingdom
- Name: HMS Saxifrage
- Builder: Lobnitz & Company, Renfrew, Scotland
- Yard number: 827
- Launched: 29 January 1918
- Renamed: HMS President, July 1922; HMS President (1918), 1988
- Nickname(s): "Mystery Ship"
- Fate: Sold, 1988; resold 2001 & 2006, sold in 2018 Abandoned 2022
- Status: Awaiting scrapping

General characteristics
- Class & type: Anchusa-class sloop
- Displacement: 1,290 long tons (1,311 t)
- Length: 250 ft (76.2 m) p/p; 262 ft 3 in (79.9 m) o/a
- Beam: 35 ft (10.7 m)
- Draught: 11 ft 6 in (3.5 m)
- Propulsion: 4-cylinder triple expansion steam engine; 2 boilers; 2,500 hp (1,864 kW); 1 Propeller
- Speed: 16 knots (30 km/h; 18 mph)
- Range: 260 tons coal
- Complement: 93
- Armament: 2 × QF 4 inch Mk IV guns or BL 4 inch Mk IX guns; 1 or 2 × 12-pounder guns; Depth charge throwers

HMS President (formerly HMS Saxifrage) was a retired Flower-class Q-ship that was launched in 1918. She was renamed HMS President in 1922 and moored permanently on the Thames as a Royal Navy Reserve drill ship. In 1988 she was sold to private owners and, having changed hands twice, served as a venue for conferences and functions as well as the offices for a number of media companies. She has since been moved to Chatham on the Medway in Kent since 2016, where she was abandoned in 2022. She had the suffix "(1918)" added to her name in order to distinguish her from HMS President, the Royal Naval Reserve base in St Katharine Docks. She is one of the last three surviving Royal Navy warships of the First World War. (Note: The other two are HMS Caroline in Belfast, and the 1915 monitor HMS M33 in Portsmouth dockyard) She is also the sole representative of the first type of purpose built anti-submarine vessels, and is the ancestor of World War II convoy escort sloops, which evolved into modern anti-submarine frigates.

== Design and construction ==
HMS President was built as an Anchusa-type Flower-class sloop. These were built between 1916 and 1918 as submarine hunters disguised to look like merchant ships, while carrying concealed 4-inch and 12-pounder naval guns. U-boats would dive at the sight of a naval warship, and the success of the Q-ships, or 'mystery ships' – converted merchantmen with hidden guns – led to the building of these specialised naval vessels for the same purpose. It was intended that a U-boat captain, unwilling to expend a precious torpedo on a small coastal merchantman, would surface to sink it by gunfire. As the submarine closed for the kill, the Q-ship would reveal her hidden guns and counterattack while the U-boat was at its most vulnerable on the surface. By the time the "warship-Qs" were constructed, the Germans were well aware of this tactic, and with the introduction of unrestricted submarine warfare these sloops became active rather than passive submarine chasers.

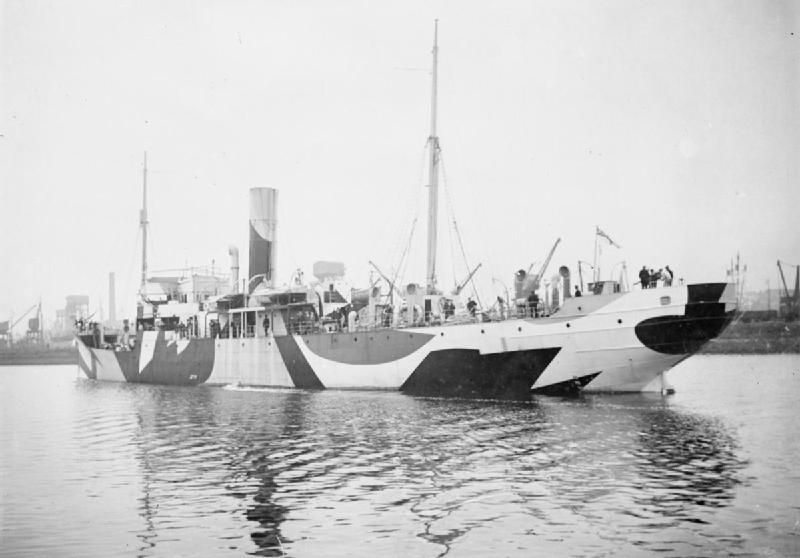
The former Anchusa-class convoy sloop HMS Saxifrage dazzle-painted in 1918.

In the case of the warship-Qs the individual builders were asked to use their existing designs for merchantmen, based on the standard Flower type warship hull. This included a dummy merchant ship sternpost rudder, mounted above the waterline over a much more manoeuvrable balanced rudder which allowed the ship to make a fast turn to bring her guns or depth charges to bear on a U-boat, or even to ram it before it could escape.

The class were also given a wide variety of spectacular dazzle camouflage schemes to confuse the primitive range finders of World War I submarines. Altogether, 120 Flowers were built, of which eighteen were sunk in action during the war.

Saxifrage was built at the shipyard of Lobnitz & Company, Renfrew, Scotland, as yard number 827 and launched on 29 January 1918. She was named Saxifrage after the flower also known as London Pride.

== Naval service ==
=== Active service ===
HMS Saxifrage escorted convoys in UK waters during 1918, and engaged nine U-boats, as recorded in her logbooks held in the National Archives at Kew. In 1922 she was permanently moored on the Thames, and renamed President. Other members of the class served as patrol vessels throughout the world during the peacetime years between the wars, but almost all were disposed of by the Second World War. This allowed the majority of the class names to be revived for the new, smaller Flower-class corvettes, including both Saxifrage and Chrysanthemum. (Note: This Flower-class corvettes, based on a 1936 deep-sea whaling boat design, carried the brunt of the anti-submarine war in 1940-42 before the larger frigates became available. These World War II Flowers were immortalised by Nicholas Monsarrat in his 1951 novel The Cruel Sea)

=== Reserve service ===
From 1922 she was employed as a Royal Naval Reserve drill ship, and as such was moored permanently on the Thames at Blackfriars. Her new name was inherited from the Old President of 1829, which had been based in West India Docks from 1862 to 1903 as the first London naval reserve drill ship. (Note: The name President (which might be thought an unusual choice in a constitutional monarchy such as the United Kingdom) celebrated the capture of both the French frigate Président in 1806, and the American 'super frigate' USS President in 1815) The 1918 President remained in Royal Navy service for a total of seventy years, from 1918 to 1988. She was the last Royal Navy warship to wear Victorian battleship livery of black hull, white superstructure and buff yellow funnel and masts. All naval personnel working at the Admiralty and elsewhere in London were nominally appointed to service in President, and they were paid and administered by her staff. MI6/SIS officers who had RN commissions were appointed to President, but paid and administered by the SIS.

During the Second World War President was converted to a gunnery training ship, fitted with a large overall "shed" superstructure. Her major role was the training of DEMS gunners for defensively equipped merchant ships. Her sister Flower class Q-ship, HMS Chrysanthemum, was moored ahead of her in 1938 to provide additional office and training space.

After the war both ships were reconstructed by the Royal Navy with large deckhouses fore and aft, giving an improved drill area and extra offices; they were also provided with tall wheelhouses and dummy funnels. These were dismountable, so they could pass under the London bridges to be periodically maintained in one of the Thames dockyards. In this form, they continued in use as Royal Naval Reserve training ships until 1988, each matching Old President's total of more than seventy years in naval service. Since 1988 the name HMS President has been used for a shore establishment of the Royal Naval Reserve in St Katharine Docks near Tower Bridge.

== Civilian use ==
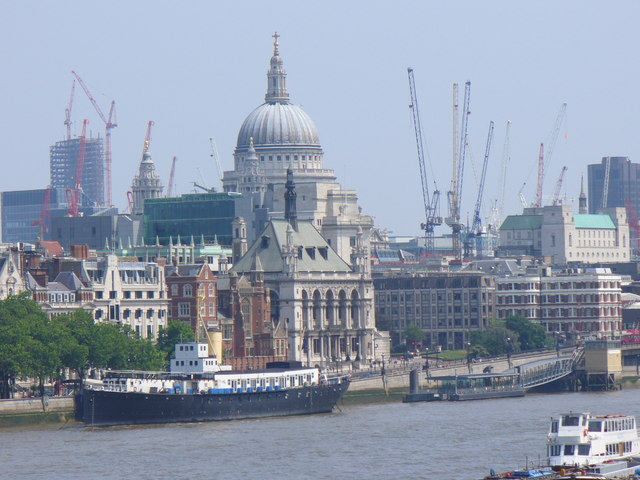
A view of President with St Paul's Cathedral and the City of London in the background

=== Charitable venue ===
In 1988 the ship was saved by the charity, Inter-Action Social Enterprise Trust, run by ED Berman. President social enterprises included: a base for start-up companies for young people; audio-visual studios; a publishing company; an NGO Advisory Service, and an 'event deck' to earn funding for the charity. This period saved her from scrap, and preserved her for future generations. She had become a London landmark, marked on street maps, so was permitted to retain her warship title and name "HMS President" with the added suffix "(1918)" to distinguish her from the new shore establishment of the same name.

=== Corporate venue ===
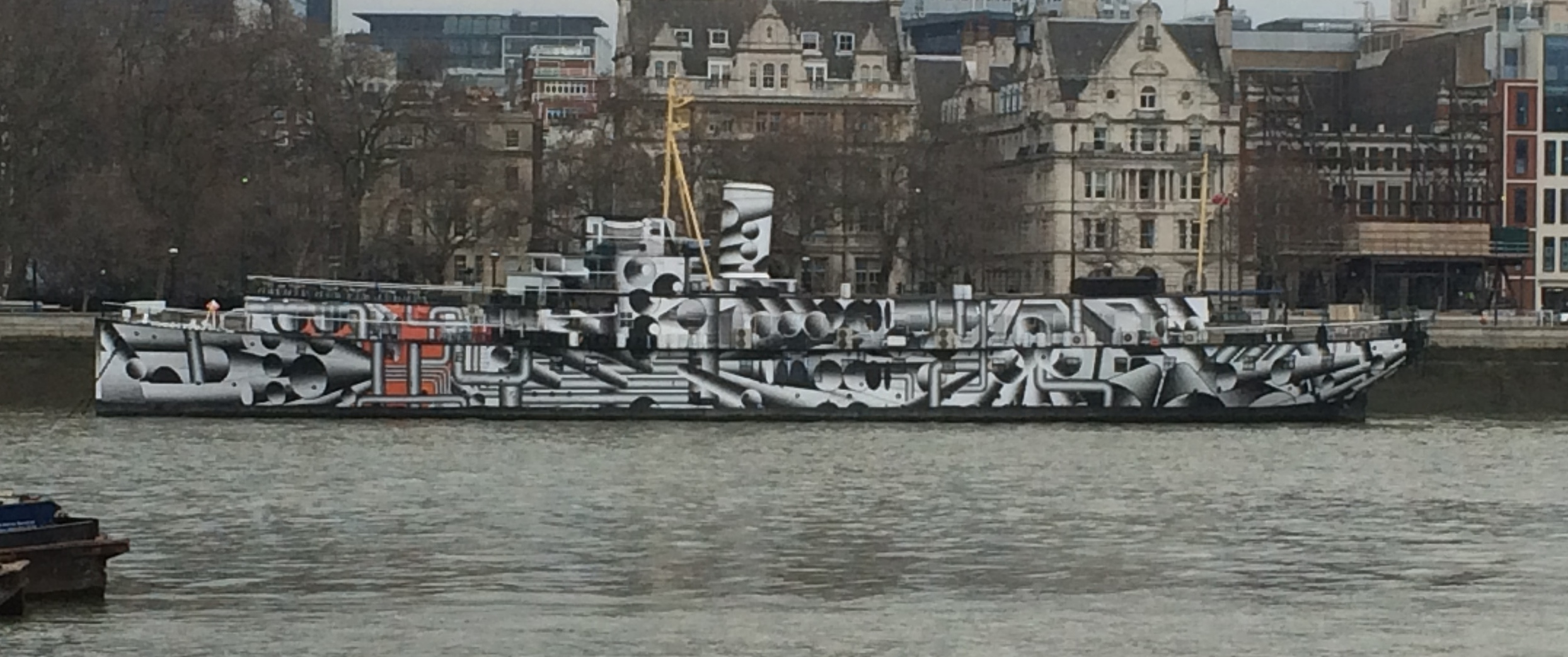
HMS President painted by Tobias Rehberger in 2014 to commemorate the use of dazzle camouflage in World War I.

President was resold in 2001 to David Harper and Cary Thornton, then purchased in April 2006 by the serviced office company, MLS Group Plc, to serve as a venue for conferences and functions and to house the offices of a number of media companies. Its owners planned to present her as an historical resource during the 2014–2018 First World War centenary, as the U-Boat campaign of World War I was the greatest peril that Britain faced in 1917–18, and was the most critical naval conflict of that war. As part of the Imperial War Museum's 14-18 Now project, HMS President was selected to be one of four "dazzle ships"; to commemorate the work of the artists who created the naval dazzle camouflage of World War I she was given a new livery, entitled Dazzle Ship London, by artist Tobias Rehberger, While the artworks were inspired by the First World War dazzle camouflage patterns, the brief was widely interpreted in each case, and they bore little resemblance to the original dazzle designs.

The ship was also used as the recording venue for Nightingale, the second album by experimental folk band Erland and the Carnival.

== Preservation ==
President had been permanently berthed in the River Thames on the Victoria Embankment in the City of London close to Blackfriars Millennium Pier since 1922. During 2016, however, she was moved to Chatham to make way for the construction of the new Thames Tideway Tunnel (one of the access tunnels will enter from Temple Avenue, next to where the ship had been moored). Ownership was transferred to a charitable trust which launched a crowdfunding appeal to seek to raise funds for restoration; however grant applications submitted to the Heritage Lottery Fund, the LIBOR fund and the National Heritage Memorial Fund were all unsuccessful.

== Fate ==
In July 2026, it was announced that a survey had found the ship to be in very poor condition and that she was to be scrapped at Erith, London by the end of the month.

== See also ==
- List of corvette and sloop classes of the Royal Navy

== Publications ==
- Colledge, J. J.; Warlow, Ben (2006) [1969]. Ships of the Royal Navy: The Complete Record of All Fighting Ships of the Royal Navy from the 15th Century to the Present (3rd Rev ed.). London: Chatham Publishing. ISBN 978-1-86176-281-8. OCLC 67375475.
