= Nightingale (Erland and the Carnival album) =

Studio album by Erland and the Carnival
- Released: 2011
- Genre: Experimental folk
- Label: Full Time Hobby
- Producer: Erland and the Carnival

Erland and the Carnival chronology
Erland & the Carnival (2010)	Nightingale (2011)	Closing Time (2014)

Nightingale is the second studio album by the folk rock project Erland and the Carnival, released in 2011 on the Full Time Hobby label. The album combines British folk themes with original rock music and received largely positive reviews." Dusted Magazine stated that "Nightingale is a distinctive exemplar of folk revivalism for the age of indie," and This is Fake DIY marked the album as the point where the band had "proven their worth in instrumental experimentation."

== Recording process ==
The album was recorded on board HMS President, a warship moored on the River Thames. According to the band, they at times tried to replicate strange noises made inside the ship. Stated Tong, "You could hear other boats passing by up the Thames. You could hear the propeller noises. It had all these weird super psychedelic sounds...We put all these contact mics around in the space we were recording in and just tried to capture it. And you'd take what you'd done home that night and have a listen to it and there'd be these weird things on the mics. Like 'What is that? I don't know, but it's definitely going to stay.'"

Whereas the previous album by the band was replete to allusions to old ballads and folk songs, Nightingale is primarily original tracks. On its cover is a relatively famous photo of Janet Hodgson flying across her bedroom, supposedly by a poltergeist. Frontman Cooper claims the art reflects the album's music, as the band was "trying to create a soundtrack to an imaginary horror film about the supernatural."

== Reception ==
Professional ratings
Review scores
Source	Rating
AllMusic	4/5 stars
DIY	3.5/5 stars
Pitchfork	5.9
The Guardian	3/5 stars
The Times	4/5 stars
Dusted Magazine	Positive

The album received positive reviews from AllMusic, This is Fake DIY, and The Times, and a positive review and 3/5 stars from The Guardian. A review by Pitchfork was mixed.

According to James Monger of AllMusic, "The group takes traditional folk music and then filters it through the swirling psych rock of Piper at the Gates of Dawn-era Pink Floyd, the electro-freak folk of Animal Collective, and the pastoral creep of bands Espers and Vetiver, resulting in a wild pastiche of digital trickery and oral tradition that channels the spirit of '70s progressive rock while staying true to pop-song brevity."

In her review for This is Fake DIY, Mary Chang wrote, "While Erland & The Carnival have moved on quickly to a newer sound for Nightingale, the overall effect is mostly successful. With this album they’ve proven their worth in instrumental experimentation; with original ideas in the lyric department merged with such imagination, the possibilities for this band are endless."

According to Dusted Magazine, "Clearly steeped in the great tradition of the British folk song, yet able to combine its structure and ethos with rock rebellion from both classic psych and more recent guitar rock, Erland & The Carnival’s Nightingale is a distinctive exemplar of folk revivalism for the age of indie."

== Track listing ==
No.	Title	Length
1.	"So Tired In The Morning"	4:08
2.	"Map Of An Englishman"	2:58
3.	"Emmeline"	4:24
4.	"I'm Not Really Here"	3:39
5.	"I Wish, I Wish"	3:20
6.	"This Night"	3:20
7.	"Nightingale"	4:11
8.	"East & West"	3:28
9.	"Springtime"	3:00
10.	"Wealldie"	4:00
11.	"Dream Of The Road"	2:54
12.	"The Trees They Grow So High"	5:03
13.	"Nothing Can Remain"	3:13
