= Tobias Rehberger =

German sculptor (born 1966)

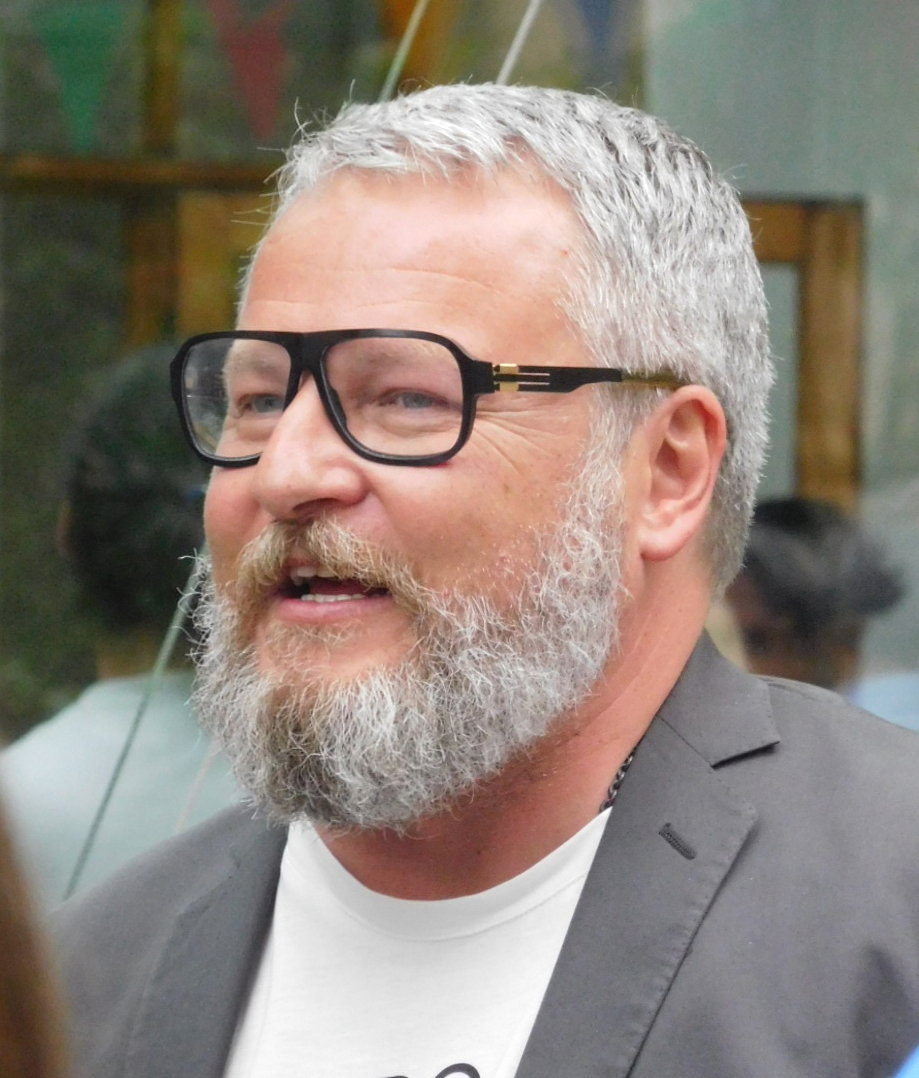
- Rehberger in 2017
- Born: June 2, 1966 (age 60); Esslingen am Neckar, Germany
- Education: Städelschule, Frankfurt am Main
- Known for: Sculpture, Contemporary Art
- Awards: Golden Lion, Venice Biennale (2009)

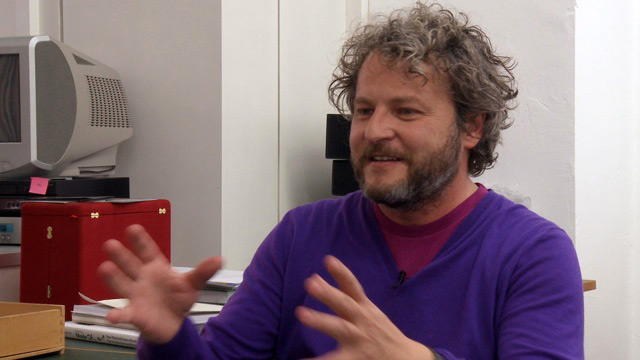
Tobias Rehberger in the movie The Future of Art (2010)

Tobias Rehberger (born June 2, 1966) is a German sculptor, born in Esslingen am Neckar. He studied under Thomas Bayrle and Martin Kippenberger at the Stadelschule in Frankfurt am Main, where he now teaches.

== Work ==
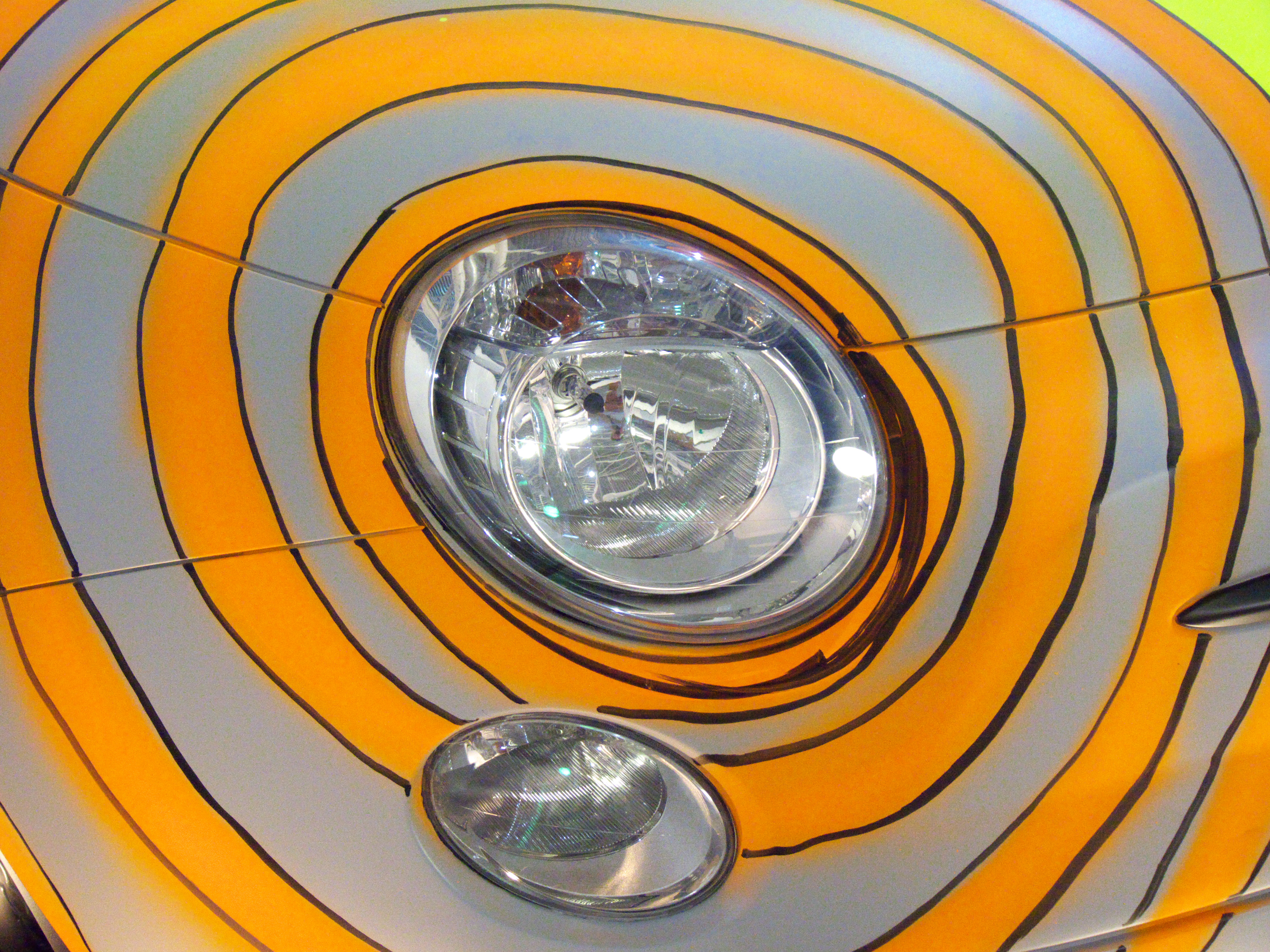
500, Artissima 17, 2010

Rehberger works in the wider sphere of design and architecture, and his art is difficult to categorize. He has created an idyllic Japanese garden in the middle of Manhattan; Pop-inspired wallpaper consisting of photographs of his organs; a series of Modernist-looking treehouses in a park in northern Germany; and an enormous tanker based on a crude boat that the father of a friend built to escape from Vietnam. Besides sculpture and spatial interventions, Rehberger has recently begun working in the classical medium of oil painting on canvas.

For his art-car series, a project that he began in 1999, Rehberger sent simple sketches, composed essentially from memory, of a Porsche 911 and a McLaren F1 to a manufacturer in Thailand. There were no measurements or schematics included. The only parameters were that the cars had to be driveable and built to human scale.

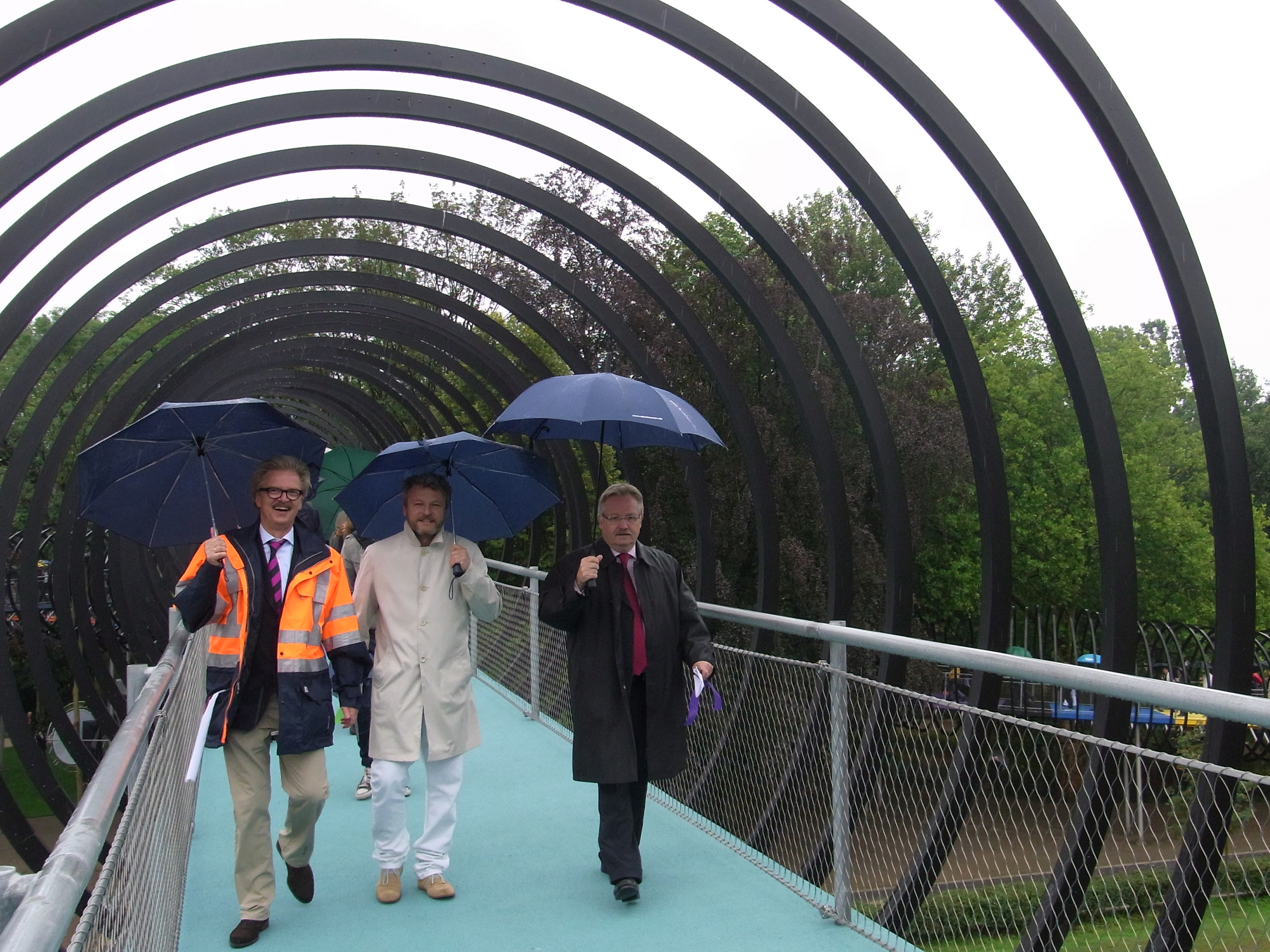
Rehberger inside Slinky Springs to Fame, 2011

Rehberger also spent some time in Cameroon, where he provided native crafts workers with his crude drawings of well-known modernist chairs and asked them to recreate the designs. The results were filled with cultural misreadings: Alvar Aalto's classic three-legged stool, for instance, was given an extra leg for stability.

On the east side of Madison Square Park in New York, Rehberger in 2001 created Tsutsumu, an elegant Japanese garden made up of a large bonsai tree, a bench and a rock. Early in the morning, even on sweltering August days, the Public Art Fund sprayed the garden with four inches of man-made snow.

Rehberger received the Golden Lion award for best artist at the 2009 Venice Biennale. In December 2011, he unveiled his public sculpture Obstinate Lighthouse, commissioned by the City of Miami Beach. In 2012, he was commissioned to design a 700 square feet (65 square metres) project space in the Leeum, Samsung Museum of Art in Seoul, Korea. Rehberger designed an exclusive collection of purses and bags for the German fashion label MCM in 2016.

In 2013, Bridget Riley claimed that a wall-sized, black-and-white checkerboard work by Tobias Rehberger plagiarised her painting Movement in Squares and asked for it to be removed from display at the Berlin State Library's reading room.

Tobias Rehberger is represented by neugerriemschneider in Berlin.

== Exhibitions (selection) ==
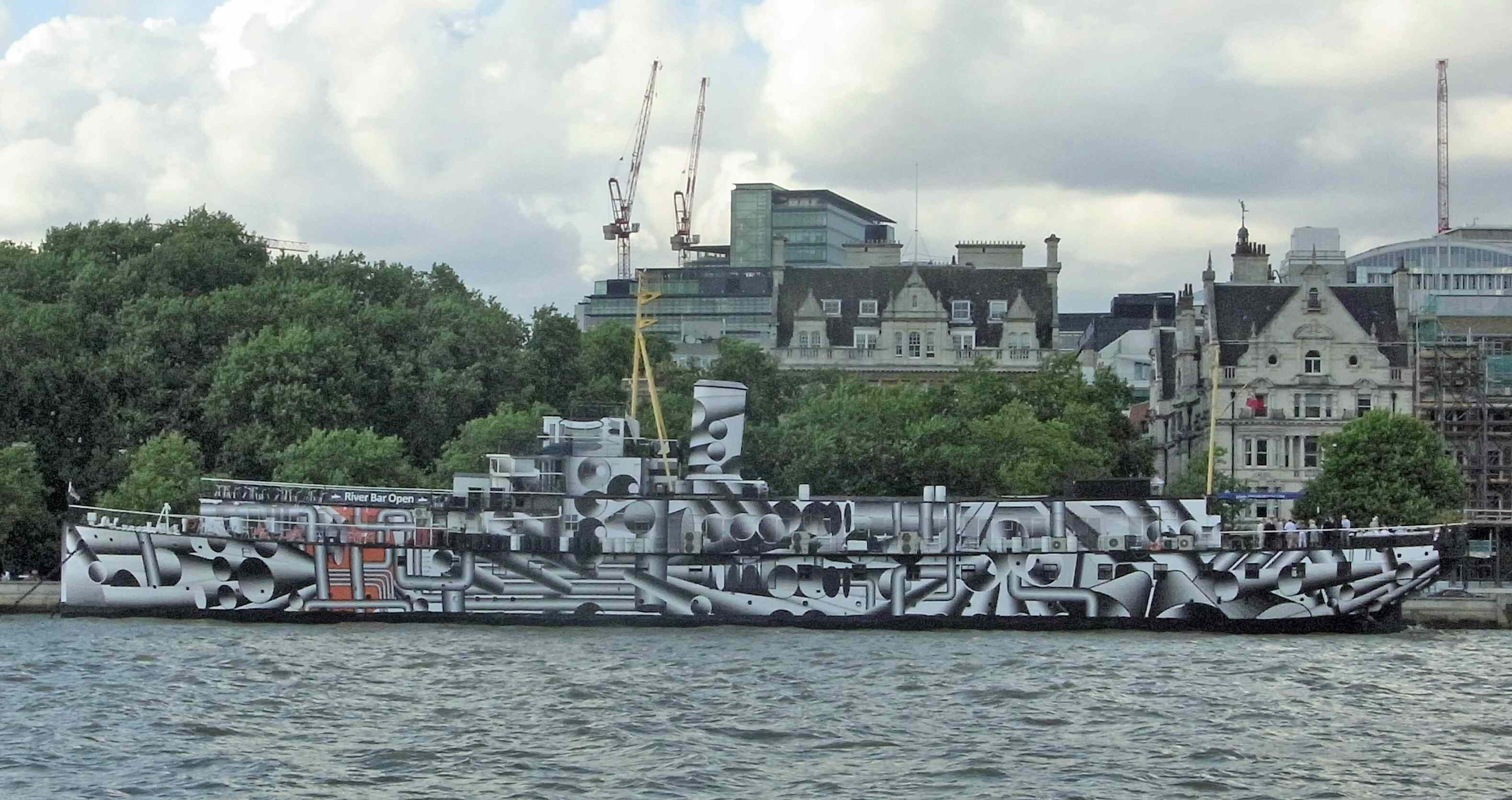
Dazzle Ship London, HMS President, London, 2014, a play on dazzle camouflage a century after the First World War

- Kunsthalle Basel 1998
- Moderna Museet, Stockholm, 1998
- Sprengel Museum, Hannover 1998
- Geläut – bis ich's hör ..., Museum für Neue Kunst, Karlsruhe, 2002
- Bitte ... danke, Galerie der Stadt Stuttgart, 2003/2004
- Private matters Whitechapel Gallery, London, 2004
- Cancelled projects, Museum Fridericianum, Cassel, 1995
- Home and away and outside installation, Schirn Kunsthalle, Frankfurt, 2014
- New York Bar Oppenheimer, Hotel Americano, New York, 2013
- Dazzle Ship London, HMS President, London, 2014

== Recognition ==
- Förderpreis des Internationalen Kunstpreises of Baden-Württemberg Landes, 1999
- Ten-Preis 2001
- Karl-Ströher-Preis 2003
- Golden Lion for Best Artist that responded to the 2009 theme "Fare Mondi // Making Worlds" Venice Biennale
