= Erland & the Carnival (album) =

Studio album by Erland and the Carnival
- Released: January 2010
- Studio: Studio 13, London, UK
- Genre: Experimental folk
- Label: Full Time Hobby

Erland and the Carnival chronology
Erland & the Carnival (2010)	Nightingale (2011)

Professional ratings
Review scores
Source	Rating
The Times	4/5 stars
BBC	(favorable)
The Guardian	(favorable)
Drowned in Sound	(7/10)

Erland & the Carnival is the debut, self-titled album by experimental folk project Erland and the Carnival. The album was released on Full Time Hobby Records in January 2010. It was highly acclaimed critically, and according to the BBC, the band has "taken various bits of existing poetry, lyrics, folk tales and songs, and melded them [into] a collection of engaging, swirling tracks and stories that sound like the soundtrack to a creepy, dreamy funfair."

== History ==
The album was recorded at Damon Albarn's Studio 13 and released on Full Time Hobby Records in January 2010.

== Reception ==
The album was received favorably by publications such as The Times, BBC, and The Guardian. The lead single from the album, "My Name Is Carnival," was named track of the day on January 28, 2010, by Clash Magazine.

According to For Folks Sake about the recording quality, the debut "is supreme in production. The crystal clarity and spatial acumen in the recording of the instrumentation and vocals is a brilliant work of dissection; each part so neatly defined and falling into one body at the same time."

According to the BBC, the band has "taken various bits of existing poetry, lyrics, folk tales and songs, and melded them together with their own organs, guitars and lyrics. The result is a collection of engaging, swirling tracks and stories that sound like the soundtrack to a creepy, dreamy funfair."

== Track listing ==
No.	Title	Length
1.	"Love is a Killing Thing"	5:25
2.	"My Name is Carnival"	3:01
3.	"You Don't Have to Be Lonely"	3:19
4.	"Trouble in Mind"	4:15
5.	"Tramps and Hawkers"	3:16
6.	"The Derby Ram"	3:40
7.	"Disturbed This Morning"	3:32
8.	"Was You Ever See"	3:39
9.	"The Sweeter the Girl the Harder I Fall"	2:59
10.	"Everything Came Too Easy"	3:01
11.	"One Morning Fair"	3:01
12.	"Gentle Gwen"	3:37
13.	"The Echoing Green"	3:39
