= We're Here Because We're Here (art event) =

Art event marking the 100th anniversary of the Battle of the Somme

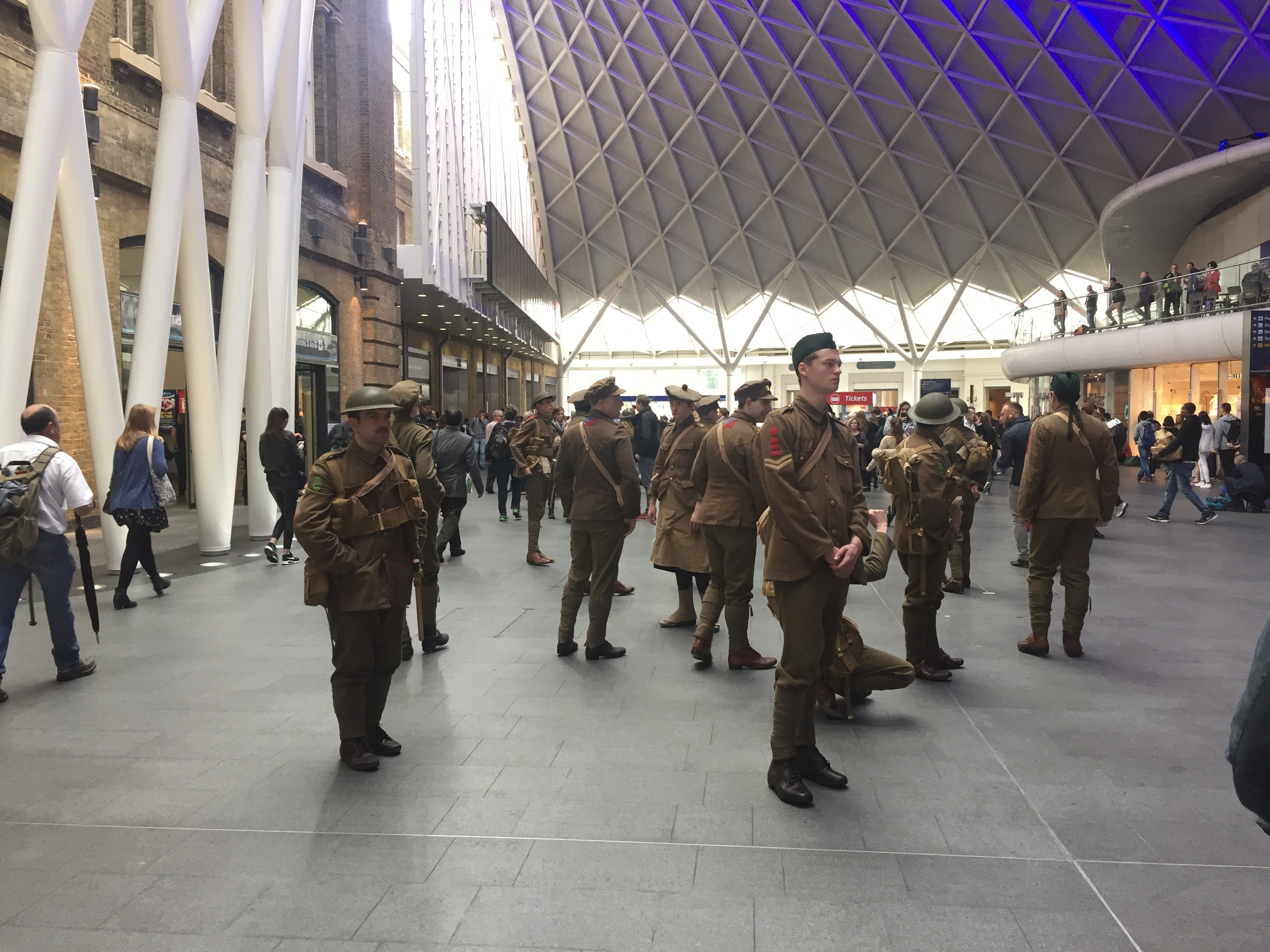
- Participants at Kings Cross station, London
- Artist: Jeremy Deller
- Year: 1 July 2016
- Type: Event
- Subject: Battle of the Somme
- Website: becausewearehere.co.uk

We're Here Because We're Here was an artwork in the form of an event, devised by Jeremy Deller, that occurred across the United Kingdom on 1 July 2016, the 100th anniversary of the Battle of the Somme, which it commemorated.

== Background ==
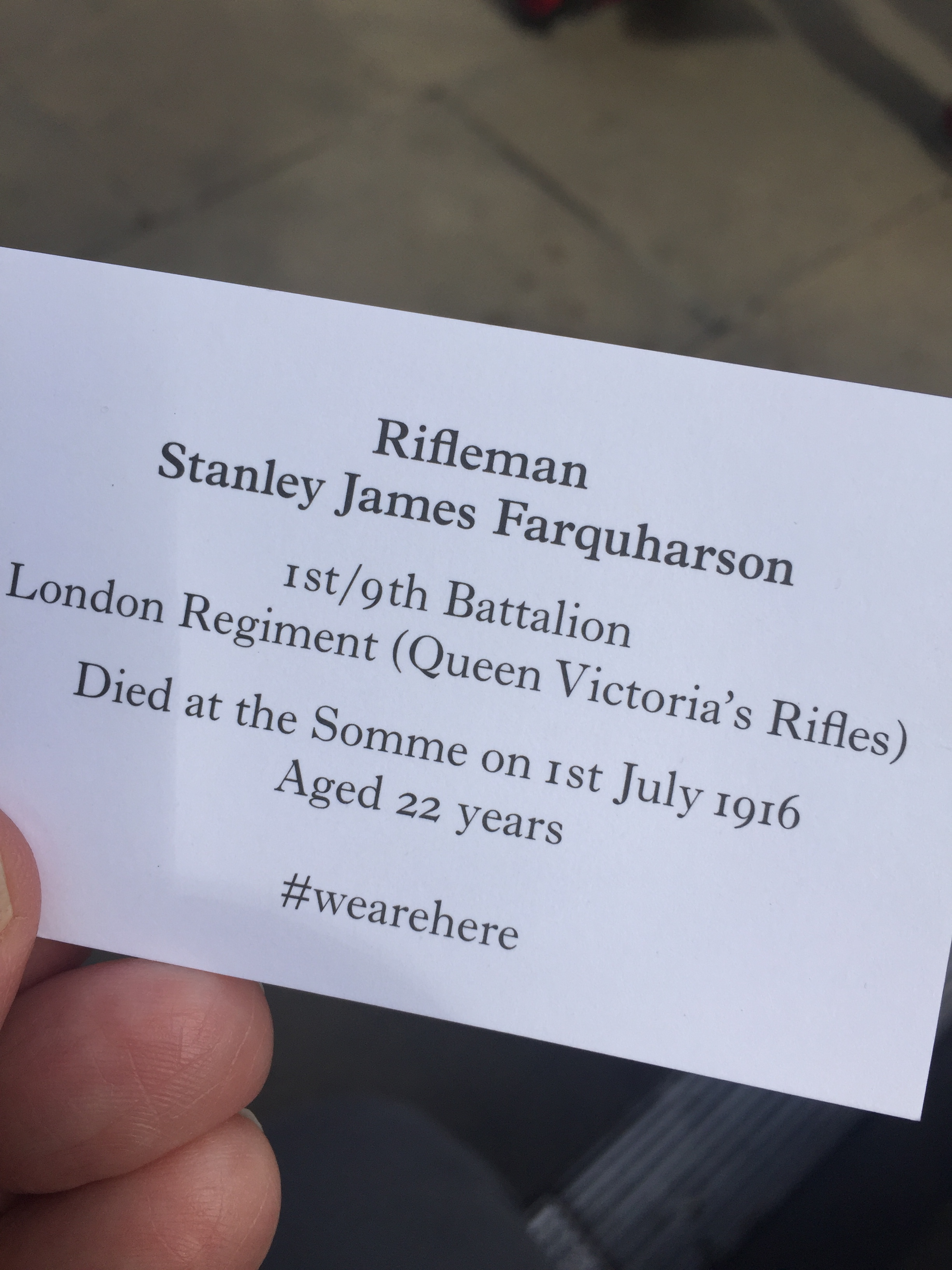
One of the cards

Throughout the day, some 1,600 volunteers, all men, dressed in replica British army uniforms of World War I, appeared in groups at railway stations, shopping centres and other places. Each volunteer represented an individual, named, soldier who died on the first day of the battle. When approached, they did not speak, but instead handed cards to members of the public, bearing the name, age and regiment of the person they represented, and the hashtag #wearehere. Deller described these cards as "like small tombstones". From time to time, the volunteers would sing the recursive refrain "We're Here Because We're Here..." to the tune of Auld Lang Syne, as sung in the trenches before the battle.

== Preparation ==
During planning, the event was kept secret, and it occurred with no advance publicity. Nonetheless, many pictures subsequently appeared on social media, with the advertised hashtag.

Deller was assisted by Rufus Norris, artistic director of the National Theatre, who came up with the idea of asking the volunteers not to speak to each other or the public. The event was produced by Birmingham Repertory Theatre and the National Theatre, and the volunteers were trained in conjunction with a number of regional theatres. The project was commissioned by the UK's arts programme 14-18 NOW, which was set up for the World War I centenary.

== Reaction and legacy ==
The public's reaction was overwhelmingly positive. Journalist Simon Ricketts described the project as having:

the power of art, of human tribute, of sombre significance. #Wearehere is a deeply uplifting action that was much needed.

and Creative Review called it:

one of the most meaningful UK public art projects of recent times

On the evening of the day of the event, Deller and Norris discussed it on BBC Radio 4's Front Row programme.

A documentary, Jeremy Deller: We're here because we're here was broadcast on BBC television on 13 November 2016, Remembrance Sunday.

Deller and Norris's book, with 100 photographs of the event, was published on the battle's 101st anniversary.

== Locations ==
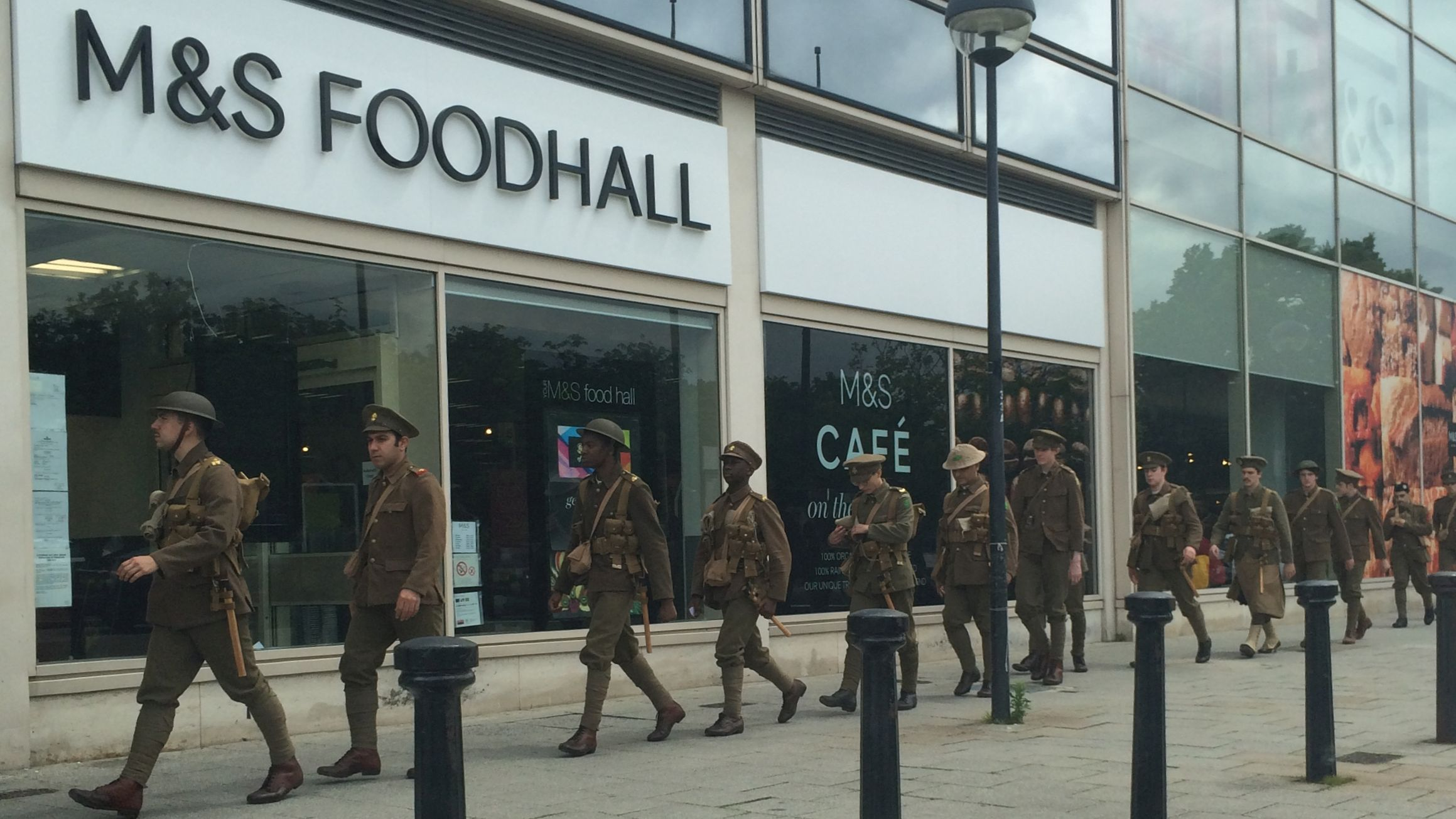
Participants in Central Milton Keynes

Locations included:

- Aberystwyth
- Bangor
- Belfast
- Blackpool
- Birmingham
- Bristol
- Chester
- Derry
- Glasgow
- Ipswich
- Lerwick, Shetland
- London
- Manchester
- Milton Keynes
- Newcastle
- Penzance
- Plymouth
- Salisbury
- Sheffield
- Snowdonia
- Southampton
- Swansea

== Bibliography ==
- Deller, Jeremy; Norris, Rufus (2017). We're Here Because We're Here. Cultureshock Media. ISBN 9780995454620.
