= 14–18 NOW =

UK's arts programme for the First World War centenary

Coordinates: 54°16′41″N 0°41′18″W

14–18 NOW was the UK's arts programme for the First World War centenary. Working with arts and heritage partners all across the UK, the programme commissioned new artworks from 420 contemporary artists, musicians, filmmakers, designers and performers, inspired by the period 1914–1918.

== History ==
In October 2012, the UK government announced its plans for marking the centenary of the First World War. They were to include an arts programme formally announced in June 2013 as the 'First World War Centenary Cultural Programme'. In line with standard guidelines on government support for arts organisations, this subsequently became 14–18 NOW, an independent organisation with its own board hosted within Imperial War Museums. It is funded by the National Lottery Heritage Fund, Arts Council England, the DCMS together with other public, voluntary and private supporters.

== Events ==
Events commissioned or produced by 14–18 NOW have included:

- Dazzle ships, 5 contemporary artists transforming real-life ships in the UK and USA, paying homage to the hundreds of ships that were ‘dazzled’ during the First World War.
- Spectra, London, Ryoji Ikeda presented a tower of light in London's sky for seven nights.
- Lights Out, more than 16 million people around the UK turned off their lights for an hour in an act of collective reflection.
- We're Here Because We're Here, more than 1,400 volunteers dressed in wartime uniform appeared unannounced across the UK as a memorial to the Battle of the Somme.
- Memorial Ground, a choral work from the Pulitzer Prize-winning American composer David Lang, made freely available to choirs and singing groups all over the UK.
- The national tour of the Wave and Weeping Window segments from the art installation Blood Swept Lands and Seas of Red, originally displayed in the moat of the Tower of London.
- Processions, a mass participatory artwork to mark the 100th anniversary of female suffrage
- They Shall Not Grow Old, a BAFTA-nominated colourised film from the Oscar-winning director Peter Jackson using archive footage to portray the war as never before.
- Pages of the Sea, Filmmaker Danny Boyle invited communities in the UK & Ireland to join him in marking 100 years since Armistice and the end of the First World War
- The Head & the Load, the world premiere of a work from William Kentridge was staged in Tate Modern's Turbine Hall.
- Nissen Hut, Turner Prize-winning artist Rachel Whiteread continues her Shy Sculpture series in Yorkshire's Dalby Forest.
- Xenos, Akram Khan, the British dancer-choreographer, explored the experience of an Indian colonial soldier at war in his last ever solo performances.
- The Art of Border Living, Documentary maker Peter Curran explored the First World War through the borderland communities of Ireland in a BBC Radio project live events and commissioned short-stories podcasts from Kamila Shamsie and others.
- Five Telegrams, a collaboration between Anna Meredith and 59 Productions was presented both at BBC Proms and Edinburgh International Festival
- Fly by Night, this outdoor work saw over 1500 LED-lit pigeons fly into the skies above the River Thames
- SS Mendi Dancing the Death Drill, a retelling of the 1917 SS Mendi tragedy, performed by South Africa's award-winning Isango Ensemble
- Nawr Yr Arwr / Now the Hero, an immersive theatrical experience from artist Marc Rees
- Still, six poems by Simon Armitage in response to aerial photographs of six battlefields, exhibited at Norwich in 2016

Artists involved with the project have included:

- Akram Khan
- Anna Meredith
- Artichoke
- Danny Boyle
- Dave McKean
- Field Music
- Gillian Wearing
- James MacMillan
- Jason Moran
- Jeremy Deller
- John Akomfrah
- Keaton Henson
- Mark Wallinger
- O'Hooley & Tidow
- Peter Jackson
- Pentagram
- Peter Curran
- Rachel Whiteread
- Richard Thompson
- Simon Armitage
- William Kentridge
- Xiaolu Guo
- Yinka Shonibare
- 59 Productions
