= Department of the Director of Naval Equipment =

Department of the British Admiralty

Agency overview
- Formed: 3 September 1912
- Dissolved: 1960
- Superseding agency: Naval Equipment Division
- Jurisdiction: Government of the United Kingdom
- Headquarters: Admiralty London
- Agency executives: Director of Naval Equipment; Assistant Director of Naval Equipment; Deputy Director of Naval Equipment
- Parent department: Admiralty

The Department of the Director of Naval Equipment also known as the Directorate of Naval Equipment was the former British Admiralty department responsible for managing the progress of all naval construction at royal naval dockyards, and annually planning programmes of works for additions, alterations, repairs and modernisation established in 1912 until 1960 when it was replaced by the Naval Equipment Division of the Ship Department.

== History ==
The department was originally established on 3 September 1912, the department was primarily concerned with overseeing the progress of all naval construction at royal naval dockyards, In addition it planned and monitored programmes of works for additions, alterations, repairs and modernisation of all ships. The department worked in partnership with the Department of the Director of Dockyards, both of these departments were overseen by the office of the Third Sea Lord from 1912 to 1939.Between 1939 and 1956 the department was assigned a number of times between the Department of the Vice-Controller of Navy who was then co-styled Vice-Controller of the Navy and Director of Naval Equipment and the Department of the Vice-Controller (Air) who was then co-styled Vice-Controller of the Navy and Director of Naval Equipment In 1960 it ceased being a distinct admiralty department when it was downgraded and replaced by the Naval Equipment Division of the new Ship Department that was headed by a Director-General, Ships.

== Directors of Naval Equipment ==
Included:

1. Rear-Admiral Arthur W. Waymouth, 3 September 1912 – January, 1915
2. Captain Clement Greatorex, 14 January 1915 – 8 October 1917
3. Rear-Admiral Edward M. Phillpotts, 8 October 1917 – 1 May 1920
4. Rear-Admiral Edward F. Bruen, 1 May 1920 – 16 May 1922
5. Rear-Admiral Douglas L. Dent, 2 May 1922
6. Rear-Admiral Arthur A. M. Duff, 16 May 1924
7. Rear-Admiral Henry W. Parker, 17 May 1926 – 17 May 1928
8. Rear-Admiral Joseph C. W. Henley, 15 May 1928 – 14 March 1930
9. Rear-Admiral Harold O. Reinold, 14 March 1930 – 2 March 1931
10. Rear-Admiral Percy L. H. Noble, – 30 November 1932
11. Rear-Admiral Cecil Ponsonby Talbot, 30 November 1932 – 10 December 1934
12. Rear-Admiral St. Aubyn B. Wake, 10 December 1934 – 10 December 1936
13. Rear-Admiral Francis Thomas B. Tower, 10 December 1936 – July 1944 and (Vice-Controller of the Navy from 1939)
14. Vice-Admiral Sir Henry C. Phillips: July 1944-June 1947 and (Vice-Controller of the Navy)
15. Rear-Admiral Matthew S. Slattery: May 1945-January 1948 (Vice-Controller Air))
16. Rear-Admiral Geoffrey A.B. Hawkins: June 1947-October 1949 and (Vice-Controller of the Navy)
17. Rear-Admiral Lachlan D. Mackintosh: January 1948-February 1950 (Vice- Controller (Air))
18. Rear-Admiral C.Aubrey L. Mansergh: October 1949-June 1950 and (Vice-Controller of the Navy)
19. Rear-Admiral E.M. Conolly Abel Smith: February 1950 – 1953 (Vice-Controller (Air))
20. Rear-Admiral JJohn Hughes-Hallett: June 1950-June 1952 and (Vice-Controller of the Navy)
21. Rear-Admiral Gerald V. Gladstone: June 1952-October 1953 and (Vice-Controller of the Navy)
22. Rear-Admiral Guy B. Sayer: October 1953-April 1956 and (Vice-Controller of the Navy)
23. Rear-Admiral Nicholas A. Copeman: April 1956-April 1957
24. Captain Maurice L. Hardie: April 1957-February 1959
25. Captain John P. Scatchard: February 1959-September 1960

=== Assistant Directors of Naval Equipment ===
Included:

- Captain Henry R. Crooke, 18 February 1913 – 1914
- Captain Ernest K. Loring, 1 October 1914 – 3 April 1915
- Captain Henry L. Cochrane, 3 April 1915
- Captain (retired) Christopher P. Metcalfe, late 1916 (for salvage work, working with Henry Lake Cochrane)
- Captain Hugh T. Walwyn, 1 March 1917 – January, 1918
- Captain Alan G. Hotham, 1917 – 1 October 1917
- Captain Percy Withers, 10 January 1918 – 7 May 1919
- Captain Arthur T. Walker, 30 May 1925 – 1 October 1926
- Captain Patrick E. Parker, 23 March 1928 – 2 April 1930
- Captain Harold G. C. Franklin, 2 April 1930 – 4 April 1932
- Captain Stuart S. Bonham-Carter, 14 March 1932 – 14 March 1936
- Captain Martin J. C. de Meric, 1 December 1938 – 18 September 1939

=== Deputy Director of Naval Equipment ===
Included:

1. Captain Hugh A.C. Dick: February 1940-December 1943
2. Captain Hon. Oswald W. Cornwallis: December 1943-January 1945
3. Captain Gerald O.C. Davies: January 1945-August 1946
4. Captain William P. McCarthy: August 1946-August 1948
5. Captain S. Brian De Courcy Ireland: August 1948-March 1951
6. Captain Charles W. Greening: March 1951-August 1952
7. Captain Howard F. Bone: August 1952-July 1954
8. Captain Richard L.S. Gaisford: July 1954-August 1955
9. Captain William W. Stewart-Fitzroy: December 1954 – 1956
10. Captain Richard L.H. Marsh: August 1955 – 1957
11. Captain Thomas N. Catlow: 1958-July 1959
12. Captain Ian S. McIntosh: July 1959 – 1960 (transferred to Naval Equipment Division (Ship Department) until July 1961)

== Department structure ==
=== Salvage Section ===
Head of Salvage Section

- Commander J. H. Dathan, 1915 -1916
- Captain Christopher P. Metcalfe, 1916 - 1917
- Hon. Captain Frederic W. Young, 1917-1920
- Commodore, Hon. Sir Frederic W. Young, 1921-1927
  - Salvage Accounts section

Note: The Salvage Section was replaced by a new Salvage Department in 1939.

=== Office of the Captain/Admiral superintendent ships building by contract ===
For Contract Work (not including Destroyers) on the Clyde

- Captain Edward Stafford Fitzherbert, 1912 - 1913
- Captain Brian H. F. Barttelot, 1913 - 1917
- Rear-Admiral John F. E. Green, 1917 - 1918
- Captain Cecil H. Fox, 1918 - 1920
- Captain Herbert, Buchanan-Woolaston, 1 January 1924 - 1926
- Captain Ambrose Thomas Norman Abbay, 1926 -1928
- Commander L. B. Hill, 30 September 1938 - 1939

Contract Work (not including Destroyers) on the Tyne, Thames, Mersey, at Barrow-in-Furness, and at Sunderland

- Captain Laurence E. Power, 1913 - 1917
- Rear-Admiral Alfred E. A. Grant, 1917 - 1918
- Captain William F. Slayter, 1918 -1920

=== Office of the Captain/Admiral superintendent destroyers building by contract ===
Included:

- Captain Douglas L. Dent, 1912 - 1913
- Captain Cyril Asser, 1913 - 1917
- Rear-Admiral Laurence E. Power, 1917 - 1918
- Captain Frank F. Rose, 1918 -1920
- Commander L. B. Hill, 1933 -1937
- Vice-Admiral, St, A. B. Wake, Retd, 1937-1939

== Sources ==
- Mackie, Colin, (2010-2014), British Armed Services between 1860 and the present day — Royal Navy - Senior Appointments, http://www.gulabin.com/.
- Harley Simon, Lovell Tony, (2017), Department of the Director of Naval Equipment, http://www.dreadnoughtproject.org.
- Rodger, N.A.M. (1979). The Admiralty. Offices of State. Lavenham: T. Dalton. ISBN 0900963948.

== Attribution ==
- The primary source for this article is by Harley Simon, Lovell Tony, (2017), http://www.dreadnoughtproject.org/Department of the Director of Naval Equipment
