= Dazzle camouflage =

Family of ship camouflage

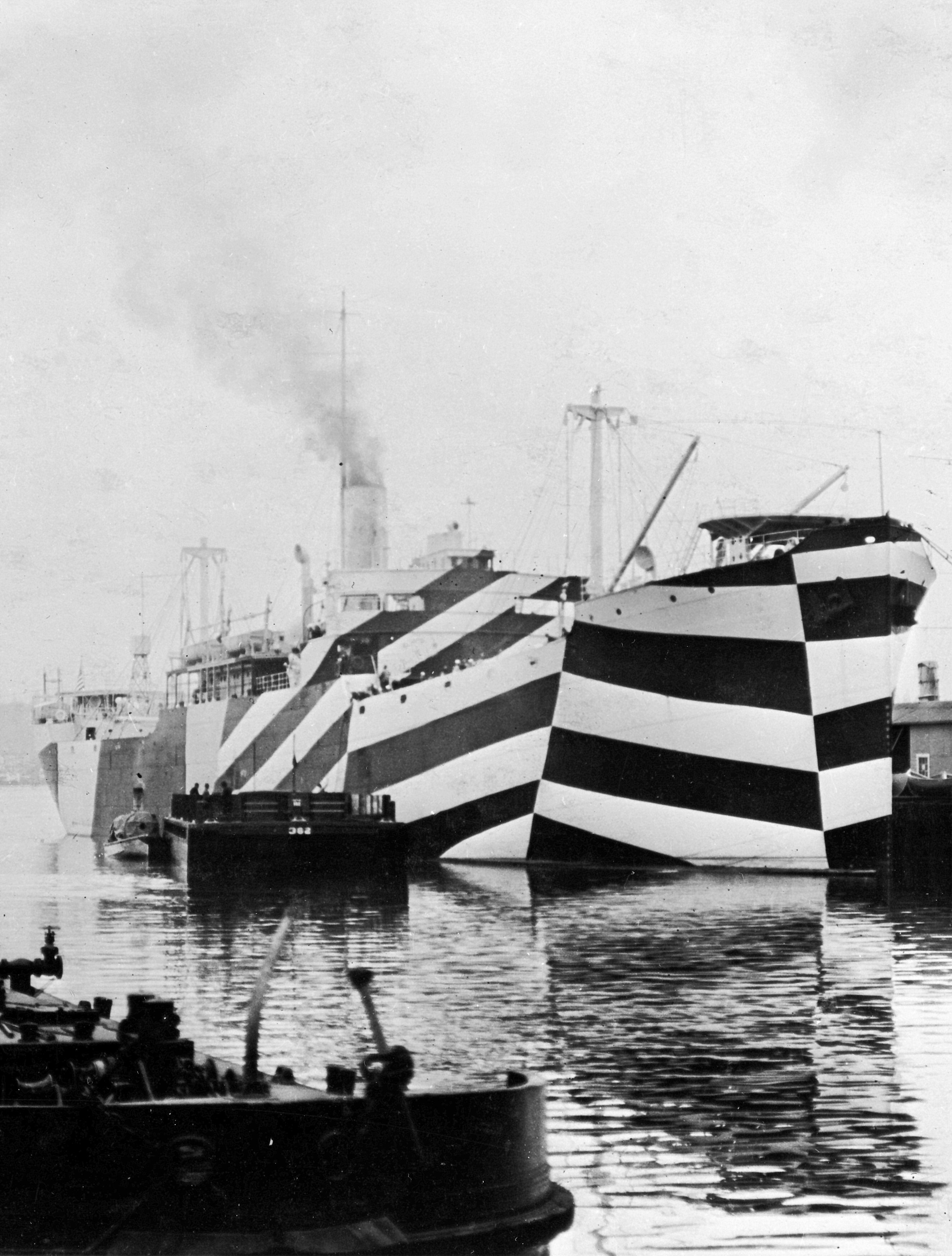
USS West Mahomet in dazzle camouflage, 1918

Dazzle camouflage, also known as razzle dazzle (in the U.S.) or dazzle painting, is a type of ship camouflage that was used extensively in World War I, and to a lesser extent in World War II and afterwards. Credited to the British marine artist Norman Wilkinson, though with a rejected prior claim by the zoologist John Graham Kerr, it consisted of complex patterns of geometric shapes in contrasting colours interrupting and intersecting each other.

Unlike other forms of camouflage, the intention of dazzle is not to conceal but to make it difficult to estimate a target's range, speed, and heading. Norman Wilkinson explained in 1919 that he had intended dazzle primarily to mislead the enemy about a ship's course and so cause them to take up a poor firing position. (Note: Wilkinson said "The primary object of this scheme was not so much to cause the enemy to miss his shot when actually in firing position, but to mislead him, when the ship was first sighted, as to the correct position to take up. Dazzle was a method to produce an effect by paint in such a way that all accepted forms of a ship are broken up by masses of strongly contrasted colour, consequently making it a matter of difficulty for a submarine to decide on the exact course of the vessel to be attacked." For example, an enemy submarine might position itself poorly, leaving itself at long range or out of range altogether. Wilkinson further wrote that dazzle was designed "not for low visibility, but in such a way as to break up her form and thus confuse a submarine officer as to the course on which she was heading".)

Dazzle was adopted by the Admiralty in the UK, and then by the United States Navy. Each ship's dazzle pattern was unique to avoid making classes of ships instantly recognisable to the enemy. The result was that a profusion of dazzle schemes was tried, and the evidence for their success was, at best, mixed. So many factors were involved that it was impossible to determine which were important, and whether any of the colour schemes were effective. Experiments were carried out on aircraft in both World Wars with little success.

Dazzle attracted the notice of artists such as Picasso, who claimed that Cubists like he had invented it. Edward Wadsworth, who supervised the camouflaging of over 2,000 ships during the First World War, painted a series of canvases of dazzle ships (Note: For example, Wadsworth's Dazzle-ships in Drydock at Liverpool, 1919.) after the war, based on his wartime work. Arthur Lismer similarly painted a series of dazzle ship canvases.

== Intended purposes ==
Depiction of how Norman Wilkinson intended dazzle camouflage to cause the enemy to take up poor firing positions

At first glance, dazzle seems an unlikely form of camouflage, drawing attention to the ship rather than hiding it. The approach was developed after Allied navies were unable to develop effective means to hide ships in all weather conditions. The British zoologist John Graham Kerr proposed the application of camouflage to British warships in the First World War, outlining what he believed to be the applicable principle, disruptive camouflage, in a letter to Winston Churchill in 1914 explaining the goal was to confuse, not to conceal, by disrupting a ship's outline. Kerr compared the effect to that created by the patterns on a series of land animals, the giraffe, zebra and jaguar.

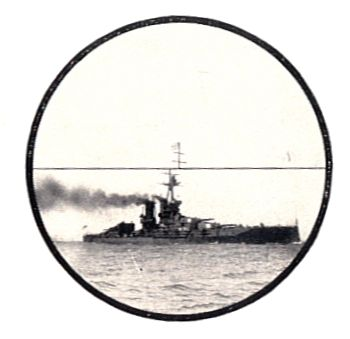
Eyepiece image of a warship in a naval coincidence rangefinder, image halves not yet adjusted for range. The target's masts are especially useful for rangefinding, so Kerr proposed disrupting these with white bands.

Taking up the zebra example, Kerr proposed that the vertical lines of ships' masts be disrupted with irregular white bands. Hiding these would make ships less conspicuous, and would "greatly increase the difficulty of accurate range finding". (Note: Kerr thought this because, as shown in the rangefinder eyepiece image, masts provide ideal verticals to align.) However, in the same letter, Kerr also called for countershading, the use of paint to obliterate self-shading and thus to flatten out the appearance of solid, recognisable shapes. For example, he proposed painting ships' guns grey on top, grading to white below, so the guns would disappear against a grey background.

Similarly, he advised painting shaded parts of the ship white, and brightly lit parts in grey, again with smooth grading between them, making shapes and structures invisible. Kerr was thus hoping to achieve both a measure of invisibility and a degree of confusion for the enemy using a rangefinder. Whether through this mixing of goals, or the Admiralty's scepticism about "any theory based upon the analogy of animals", the Admiralty claimed in July 1915 to have conducted "various trials" and decided to paint its ships in monotone grey, not adopting any of Kerr's suggestions. It had made up its mind, and all Kerr's subsequent letters achieved nothing.

The American artist Abbott Handerson Thayer had developed a theory of camouflage based on countershading and disruptive coloration, which he had published in the controversial 1909 book Concealing-Coloration in the Animal Kingdom. Seeing the opportunity to put his theory into service, Thayer wrote to Churchill in February 1915, proposing to camouflage submarines by countershading them like fish such as mackerel, and advocating painting ships white to make them invisible. His ideas were considered by the Admiralty, but rejected along with Kerr's proposals as being "freak methods of painting ships ... of academic interest but not of practical advantage".

The Admiralty noted that the required camouflage would vary depending on the light, the changing colours of sea and sky, the time of day, and the angle of the sun. Thayer made repeated and desperate efforts to persuade the authorities, and in November 1915 travelled to England where he gave demonstrations of his theory around the country. He had a warm welcome from Kerr in Glasgow, and was so enthused by this show of support that he avoided meeting the War Office, who he had been intending to win over, and instead sailed home, continuing to write ineffective letters to the British and American authorities.

The marine artist and Royal Naval Volunteer Reserve officer Norman Wilkinson, agreed with Kerr that dazzle's aim was confusion rather than concealment, but disagreed about the type of confusion to be sown in the enemy's mind. What Wilkinson wanted to do was to make it difficult for an enemy to estimate a ship's type, size, speed, and heading, and thereby confuse enemy ship commanders into taking mistaken or poor firing positions. An observer would find it difficult to know exactly whether the stern or the bow was in view; and it would be correspondingly difficult to estimate whether the observed vessel was moving towards or away from the observer's position.

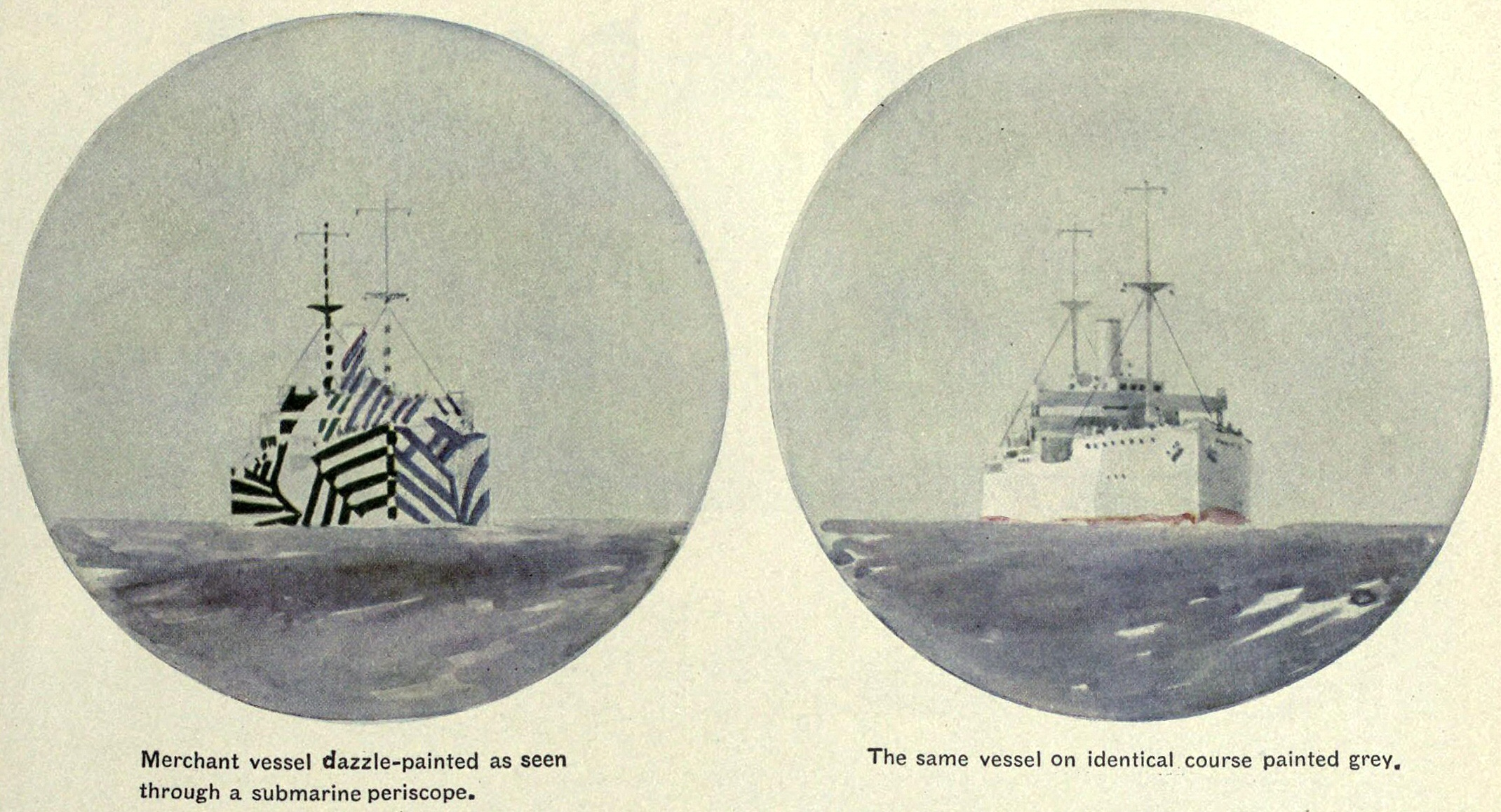
Claimed effectiveness: Artist's conception of a U-boat commander's periscope view of a merchant ship in dazzle camouflage (left) and the same ship uncamouflaged (right), Encyclopædia Britannica, 1922. The conspicuous markings obscure the ship's heading.

Wilkinson advocated "masses of strongly contrasted colour" to confuse the enemy about a ship's heading. (Note: Wilkinson said that dazzle was a "method to produce an effect by paint in such a way that all accepted forms of a ship are broken up by masses of strongly contrasted colour, consequently making it a matter of difficulty for a submarine to decide on the exact course of the vessel to be attacked.") Thus, while dazzle, in some lighting conditions or at close ranges, might actually increase a ship's visibility, the conspicuous patterns would obscure the outlines of the ship's hull (though admittedly not the superstructure), disguising the ship's correct heading and making it harder to hit.

Dazzle was created in response to an extreme need, and hosted by an organisation, the Admiralty, which had already rejected an approach supported by scientific theory: Kerr's proposal to use "parti-colouring" based on the known camouflage methods of disruptive coloration and countershading. This was dropped in favour of an admittedly non-scientific approach, led by the socially well-connected Wilkinson. Kerr's explanations of the principles were clear, logical, and based on years of study, while Wilkinson's were simple and inspirational, based on an artist's perception. The decision was likely because the Admiralty felt comfortable with Wilkinson, in sharp contrast to their awkward relationship with the stubborn and pedantic Kerr.

Wilkinson claimed not to have known of the zoological theories of camouflage of Kerr and Thayer, admitting only to having heard of the "old invisibility-idea" from Roman times. (Note: Vegetius had recorded "Venetian blue" (bluish-green, the same colour as the sea) was used for ship camouflage during the Gallic Wars, when Julius Caesar had sent his scout ships to gather intelligence along the coast of Britain.)

It was Wilkinson's social connections that brought the scheme to fruition. Captain Clement Greatorex, the Director of Naval Equipment was introduced to the idea in April 1917 and coined the term "dazzle painting". The following month, an auxiliary stores vessel, HMS Industry, was experimentally painted to Wilkinson's design. The Admiralty refused Wilkinson any facilities to further the project, but the sculptor Francis Derwent Wood arranged for the use of studios at the Royal Academy of Arts in Burlington House. Assembling a team of art students and artists in Royal Naval Reserve uniform, including the Vorticist Edward Wadsworth, Wilkinson experimented with models mounted on a turntable which could be observed through a periscope. He then outmaneuvered the reluctant Admiralty by going straight to Joseph Maclay, the Minister of Shipping, resulting in the British Merchant Service adopting dazzle painting in October 1917 and the Royal Navy following suit shortly afterwards.

== Possible mechanisms ==
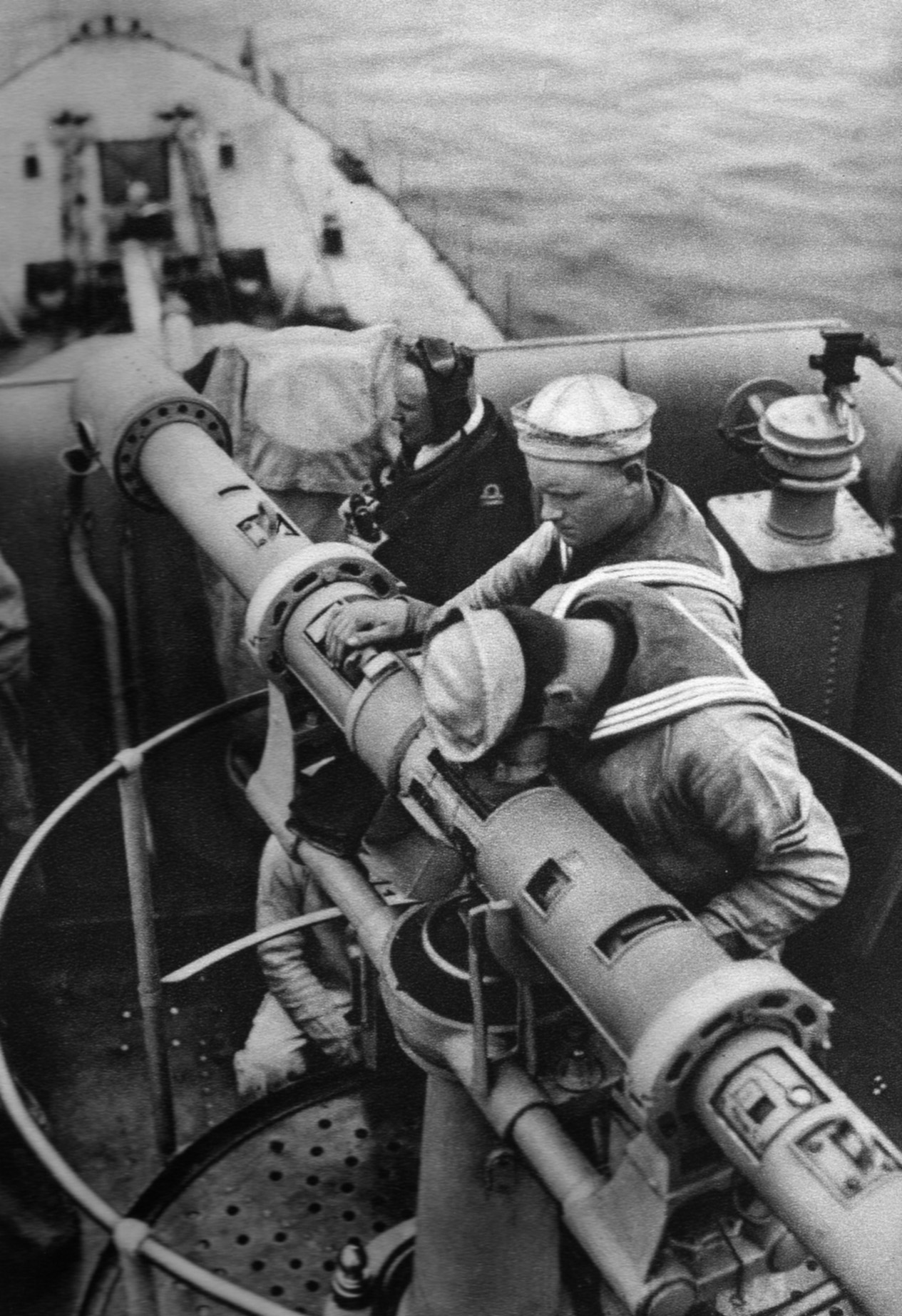
A naval coincidence rangefinder, c. 1930

=== Disrupting rangefinding ===
In 1973, the naval museum curator Robert F. Sumrall (following Kerr) suggested a mechanism by which dazzle camouflage may have sown the kind of confusion that Wilkinson had intended for it. Coincidence rangefinders used for naval artillery had an optical mechanism, operated by a human to compute the range. The operator adjusted the mechanism until the two half-images of the target lined up in a complete picture. Dazzle, Sumrall argued, was intended to make that hard, as clashing patterns looked abnormal even when the two halves were aligned, something that became more important when submarine periscopes included such rangefinders. Patterns sometimes also included a false bow wave to make it difficult for an enemy to estimate the ship's speed.

=== Disguising heading and speed ===
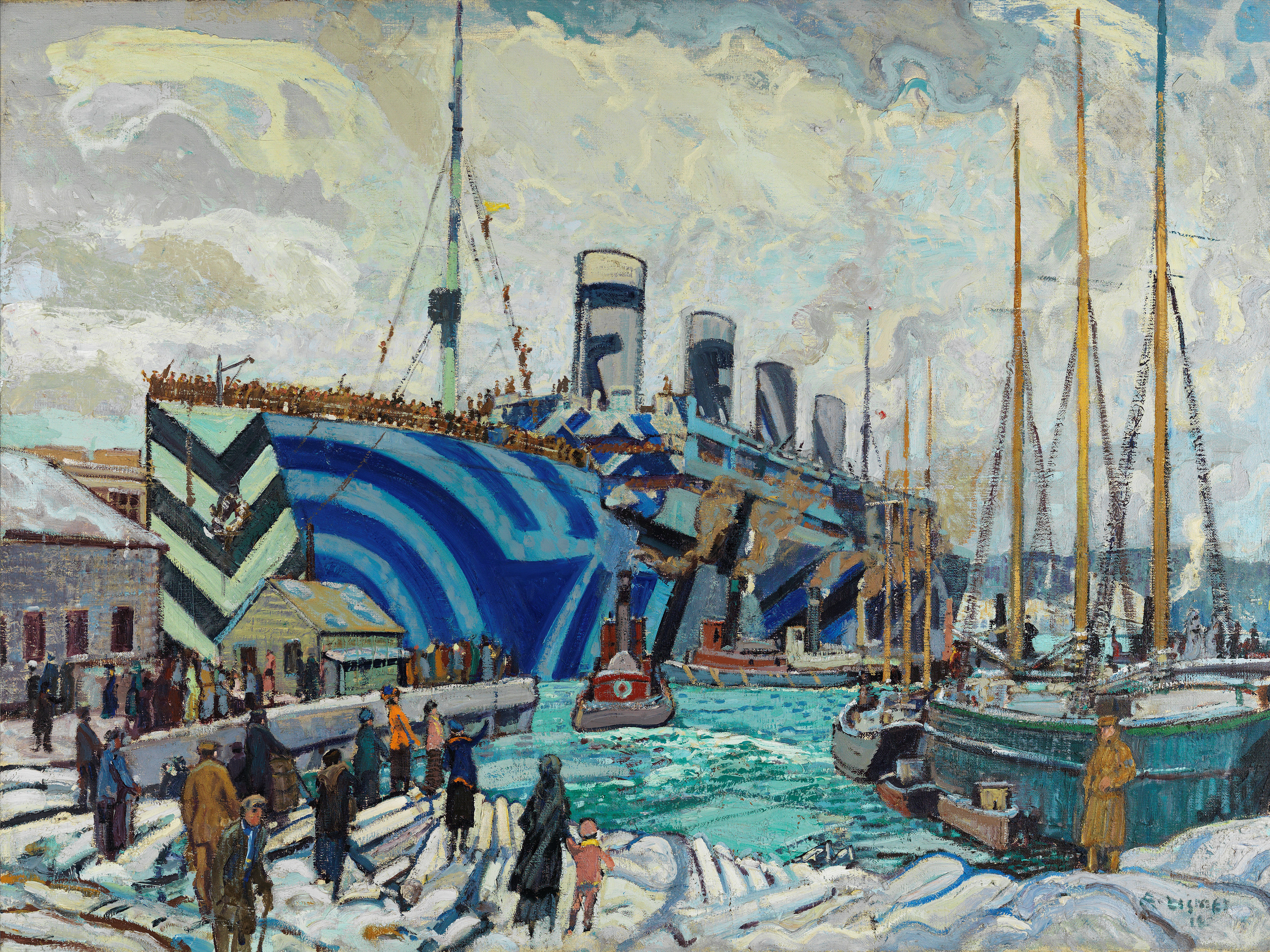
HMT Olympic, RMS Titanic's sister ship, in dazzle camouflage while in service as a World War I troopship, from September 1915

The historian Sam Willis argued that since Wilkinson knew it was impossible to make a ship invisible with paint, the "extreme opposite" was the answer, using conspicuous shapes and violent colour contrasts to confuse enemy submarine commanders. Willis pointed out, using the HMT Olympic dazzle scheme as an example, that different mechanisms could have been at work. The contradictory patterns on the ship's funnels could imply the ship was on a different heading (as Wilkinson had said). The curve on the hull below the front funnel could seem to be a false bow wave, creating a misleading impression of the ship's speed; additionally, the striped patterns on the bow and stern could create confusion about which end of the ship was which.

That dazzle did indeed work along these lines is suggested by the testimony of a U-boat captain:

It was not until she was within half a mile that I could make out she was one ship [not several] steering a course at right angles, crossing from starboard to port. The dark painted stripes on her after part made her stern appear her bow, and a broad cut of green paint amidships looks like a patch of water. The weather was bright and visibility good; this was the best camouflage I have ever seen.

In 1920, a student at Massachusetts Institute of Technology, Leo Blodgett, experimented with ship models to evaluate the effect of dazzle patterns on observers, finding that they did work to some extent. The experiments were repeated in 2025 by Tim Meese and Samantha Strong at Aston University; the team found that there were two effects: the "twist effect" in which the pattern misleads the observer about the ship's heading, and a horizon effect in which a ship seen on the horizon seems to be travelling along the horizon even if its course is 25° towards or away from the observer. Dazzle's twist effect, as Blodgett had reported, exists but is quite small; the horizon effect is far stronger.

=== Motion dazzle ===
In 2011, the scientist Nicholas E. Scott-Samuel and colleagues presented evidence using moving patterns on a computer that human perception of speed is distorted by dazzle patterns. However, the speeds required for motion dazzle are much higher than were available to First World War ships: Scott-Samuel notes that the targets in the experiment would correspond to a dazzle-patterned Land Rover vehicle at a range of 70 m (77 yd), travelling at 90 km/h (56 mph). If such a dazzling target causes a 7% confusion in the observed speed, a rocket propelled grenade travelling that distance in half a second would strike 90 cm (35 in) from the intended aiming point, or 7% of the distance moved by the target. This might be enough to save lives in the dazzle-patterned vehicle, and perhaps to cause the missile to miss entirely. (Note: The equivalent for naval artillery at a range of 7,000 m (7,700 yd) would require a ship to travel at 7000 × 90/70 = 9,000 km/h (4,900 kn; 5,600 mph) to achieve motion dazzle.)

== World War I ==
=== Royal Navy ===
In 1914, Kerr persuaded the First Lord of the Admiralty, Winston Churchill, to adopt a form of military camouflage which he called "parti-colouring". He argued both for countershading (following the American artist Abbott Thayer), and for disruptive coloration, both as used by animals. A general order to the British fleet issued on 10 November 1914 advocated use of Kerr's approach. It was applied in various ways to British warships such as HMS Implacable, where officers noted approvingly that the pattern "increased difficulty of accurate range finding". However, following Churchill's departure from the Admiralty, the Royal Navy reverted to plain grey paint schemes, informing Kerr in July 1915 that "various trials had been undertaken and that the range of conditions of light and surroundings rendered it necessary to modify considerably any theory based upon the analogy of [the colours and patterns of] animals".

The British Army inaugurated its Camouflage Section for land use at the end of 1916. At sea in 1917, heavy losses of merchant ships to Germany's unrestricted submarine warfare campaign led to new desire for camouflage. The marine painter Norman Wilkinson promoted a system of stripes and broken lines "to distort the external shape by violent colour contrasts" and confuse the enemy about the speed and dimensions of a ship.

Wilkinson, then a lieutenant commander on Royal Navy patrol duty, implemented the precursor of "dazzle" beginning with the merchantman SS Industry. Wilkinson was put in charge of a camouflage unit which used the technique on large groups of merchant ships. Over 4000 British merchant ships were painted in what came to be known as "dazzle camouflage"; dazzle was also applied to some 400 naval vessels, starting in August 1917. (Note: In August 1917, HMS Alsatian was painted in a dazzle pattern, perhaps the first Royal Navy vessel to be camouflaged in this way.)

All British patterns were different, first tested on small wooden models viewed through a periscope in a studio. Most of the model designs were painted by women from London's Royal Academy of Arts. A foreman then scaled up their designs for the real thing. Painters, however, were not alone in the project. Creative people including sculptors, artists, and set designers designed camouflage.

Wilkinson's dazzle camouflage was accepted by the Admiralty, even without practical visual assessment protocols for improving performance by modifying designs and colours. The dazzle camouflage strategy was adopted by other navies. This led to more scientific studies of colour options which might enhance camouflage effectiveness.

After the war, starting on 27 October 1919, an Admiralty committee met to determine who had priority for the invention of dazzle. Kerr was asked whether he thought Wilkinson had personally benefited from anything that he, Kerr, had written. Kerr avoided the question, implying that he had not, and said "I make no claim to have invented the principle of parti-colouring, this principle was, of course, invented by nature". He agreed also that he had not suggested anywhere in his letters that his system would "create an illusion as to the course of the vessel painted". In October 1920 the Admiralty told Kerr that he was not seen as responsible for dazzle painting. In 1922 Wilkinson was awarded the sum of £2000 for the invention.

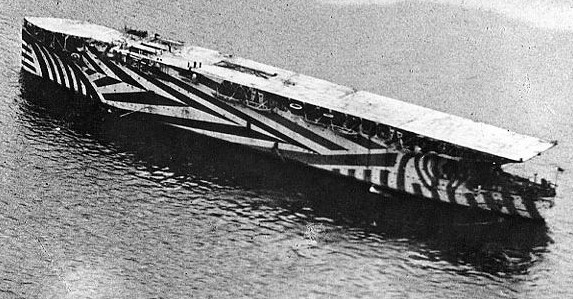
HMS Argus in dazzle camouflage in 1918

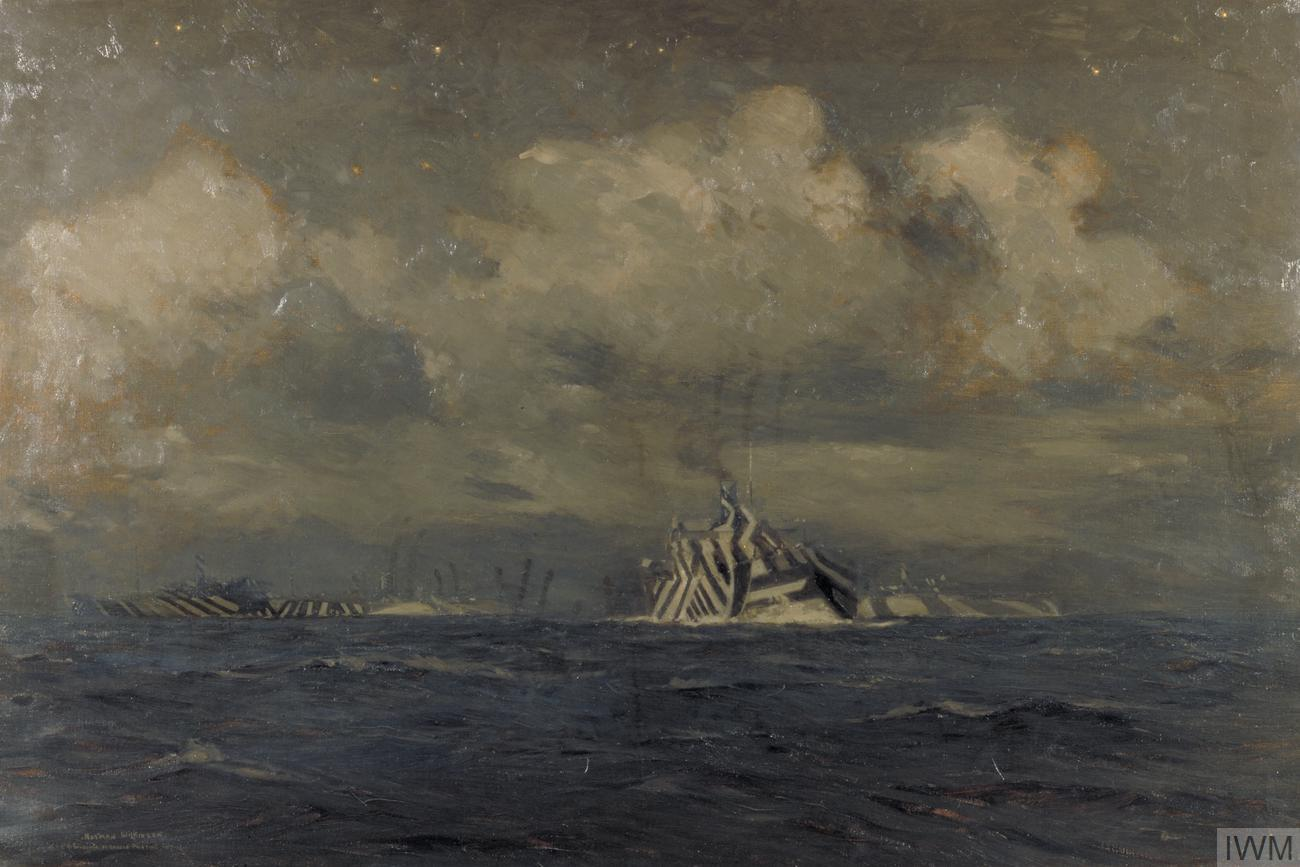
A painting by Norman Wilkinson of a moonlit convoy wearing his dazzle camouflage, 1918

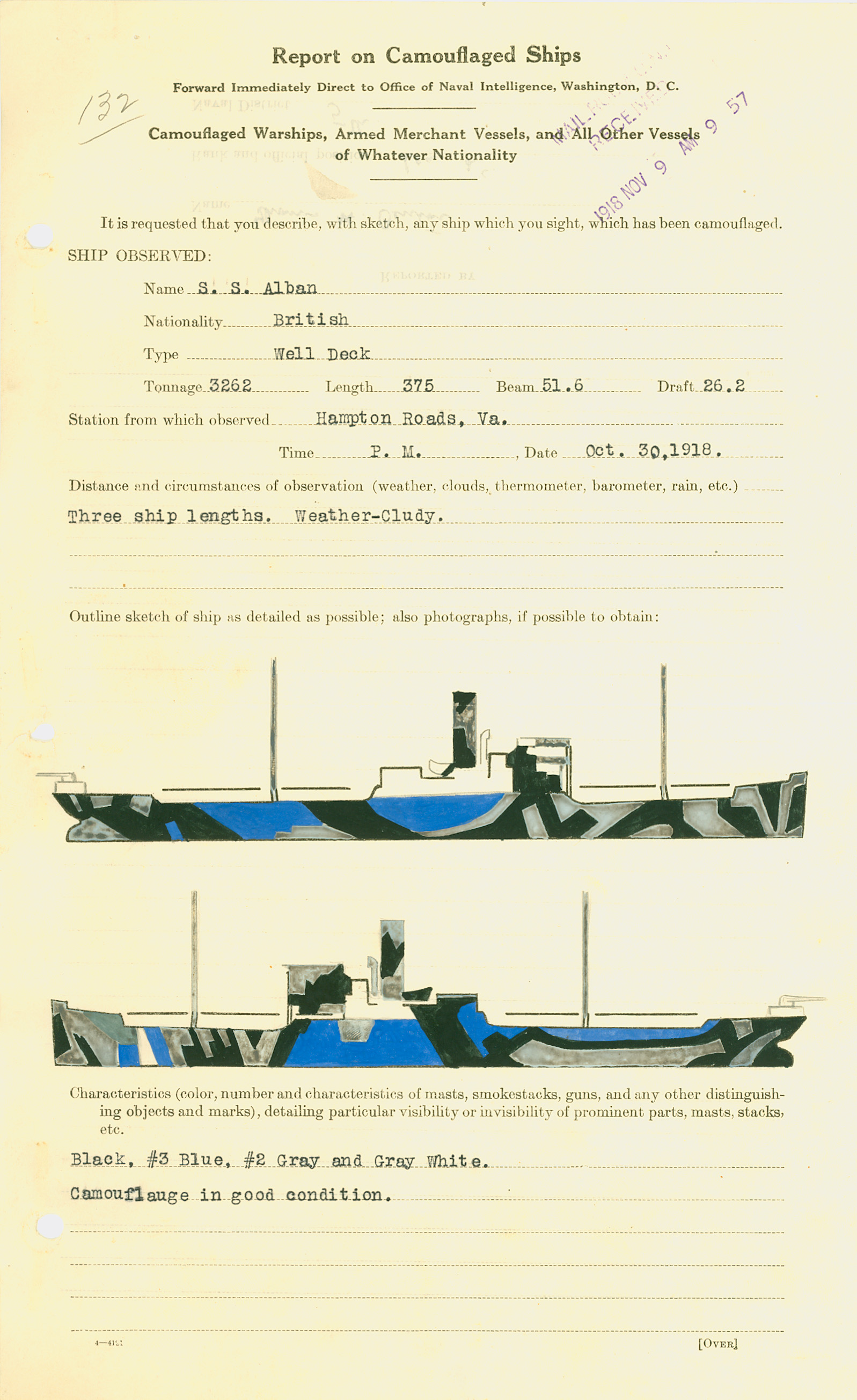
Official report on a camouflaged ship in 1918; pattern by Thomas Hart Benton

=== Royal Flying Corps ===
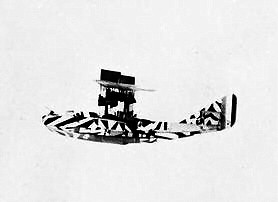
A Felixstowe F.2, finished in a naval black and white scheme

In the First World War, experiments were conducted on British aircraft such as the Royal Flying Corps' Sopwith Camels to make their angle and direction difficult to judge for an enemy gunner. Similarly the Royal Navy painted some of their Felixstowe flying boats with bold disrupting lines similar to those of their ship camouflage. The effect remained dubious, but was found to reduce the incidence of the planes being targeted by anti-aircraft gunners on their own side.

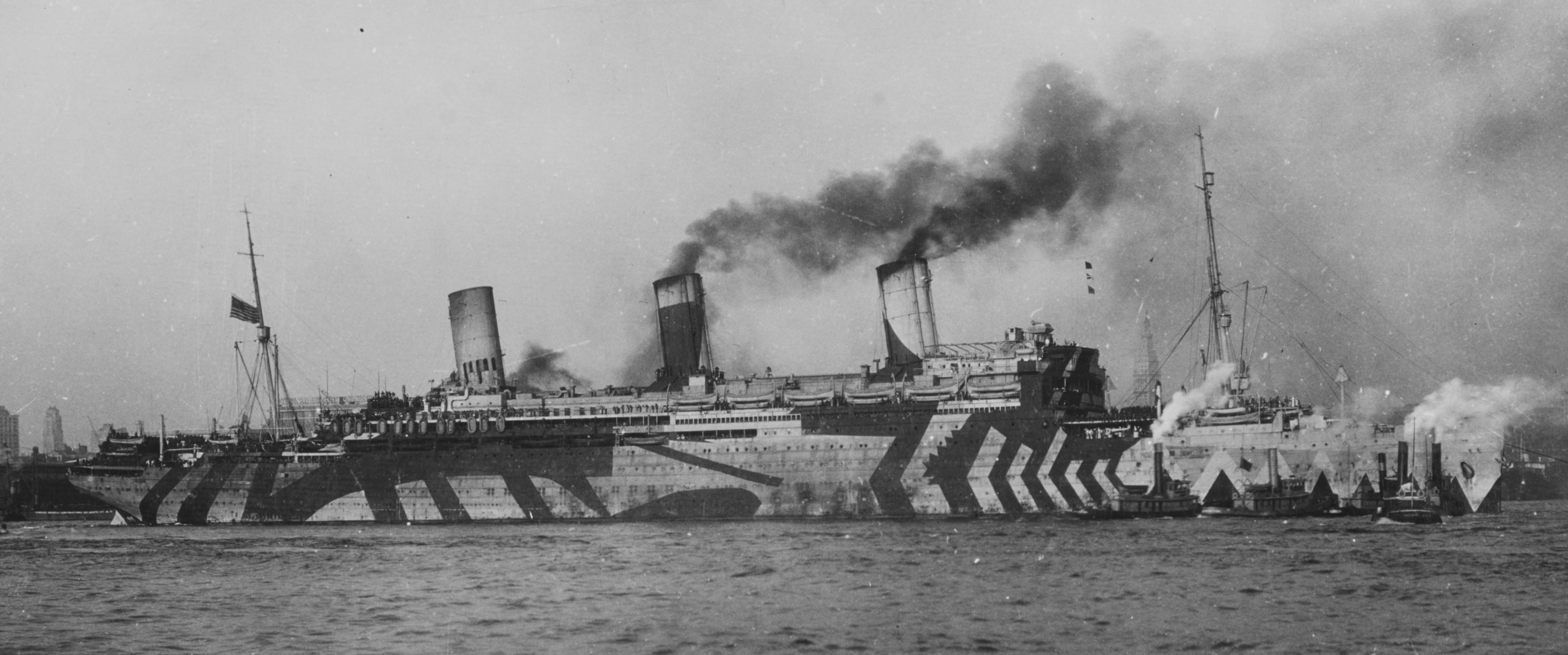
USS Leviathan in dazzle camouflage, July 1918

=== Effectiveness ===
Dazzle's effectiveness was highly uncertain at the time of the First World War, but it was nonetheless adopted both in the UK and North America. In 1918, the Admiralty analysed shipping losses, but was unable to draw clear conclusions. Dazzle ships had been attacked in 1.47% of sailings, compared to 1.12% for uncamouflaged ships, suggesting increased visibility, but as Wilkinson had argued, dazzle was not attempting to make ships hard to see. Suggestively, of the ships that were struck by torpedoes, 43% of the dazzle ships sank, compared to 54% of the uncamouflaged.

Similarly, 41% of the dazzle ships were struck amidships, compared to 52% of the uncamouflaged. These comparisons could be taken to imply that submarine commanders had more difficulty in deciding where a ship was heading and where to aim. However, the ships painted in dazzle were larger than the uncamouflaged ships, 38% of them being over 5000 tons compared to only 13% of uncamouflaged ships, making comparisons unreliable.

With hindsight, too many factors (choice of colour scheme; size and speed of ships; tactics used) had been varied for it to be possible to determine which factors were significant or which schemes worked best. Thayer did carry out an experiment on dazzle camouflage, but it failed to show any reliable advantage over plain paintwork.

The American data were analysed by Harold Van Buskirk in 1919. About 1,256 ships were painted in dazzle between 1 March 1918 and the end of the war on 11 November that year. Among American merchantmen 2,500 tons and over, 78 uncamouflaged ships were sunk, and only 18 camouflaged ships; out of these 18, 11 were sunk by torpedoes, 4 in collisions and 3 by mines. No US Navy ships (all camouflaged) were sunk in the period. (Note: As Buskirk claimed, less than 1% of the US merchant ships painted in dazzle were lost; but without knowing the number of non-camouflaged ships, it is not possible to calculate the comparative rates of loss.)

== World War II ==
=== Ships ===
Dazzle camouflage became less useful as rangefinders and especially aircraft became more advanced, and, by the time it was put to use again in World War II, radar further reduced its effectiveness, but it may still have confounded enemy submarines.

In the Royal Navy, dazzle paint schemes reappeared in January 1940. These were unofficial, and competitions were often held between ships for the best camouflage patterns. The Royal Navy's Camouflage Department came up with a scheme devised by a young naval officer, Peter Scott, a wildlife artist, which were developed into the Western Approaches Schemes. In 1942 the Admiralty Intermediate Disruptive Pattern came into use, followed in 1944 by the Admiralty Standard Schemes. Dazzle patterns were tested on small model ships at the Royal Navy's Directorate of Camouflage in Leamington Spa; these were painted and then viewed in a shallow tank on the building's roof.

The United States Navy implemented a camouflage painting program in World War II, and applied it to many ship classes, from patrol craft and auxiliaries to battleships and some Essex-class aircraft carriers. The designs (known as Measures, each identified with a number) were not arbitrary, but were standardised in a process which involved a planning stage, then a review, and then fleet-wide implementation.

Not all United States Navy measures involved dazzle patterns; some were simple or even totally unsophisticated, such as a false bow wave on traditional Haze Gray, or Deck Blue replacing grey over part or all of the ship (the latter to counter the kamikaze threat). Dazzle measures were used until 1945; in February 1945 the United States Navy's Pacific Fleet decided to repaint its ships in non-dazzle measures against the kamikaze threat, while the Atlantic Fleet continued to use dazzle, ships being repainted if transferred to the Pacific.

Nazi Germany's Kriegsmarine first used camouflage in the 1940 Norwegian campaign. A wide range of patterns were authorised, but most commonly black and white diagonal stripes were used. Most patterns were designed to hide ships in harbour or near the coast; they were often painted over with plain grey when operating in the Atlantic.

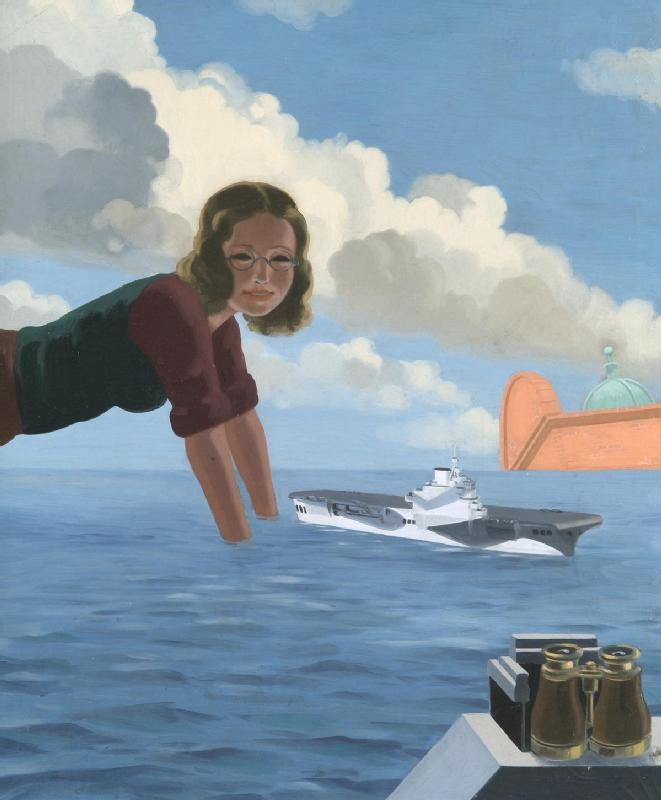
Dazzle under development: the "Outside Viewing-tank" on the roof of the Directorate of Camouflage Naval Section, Leamington Spa. James Yunge-Bateman, 1943.

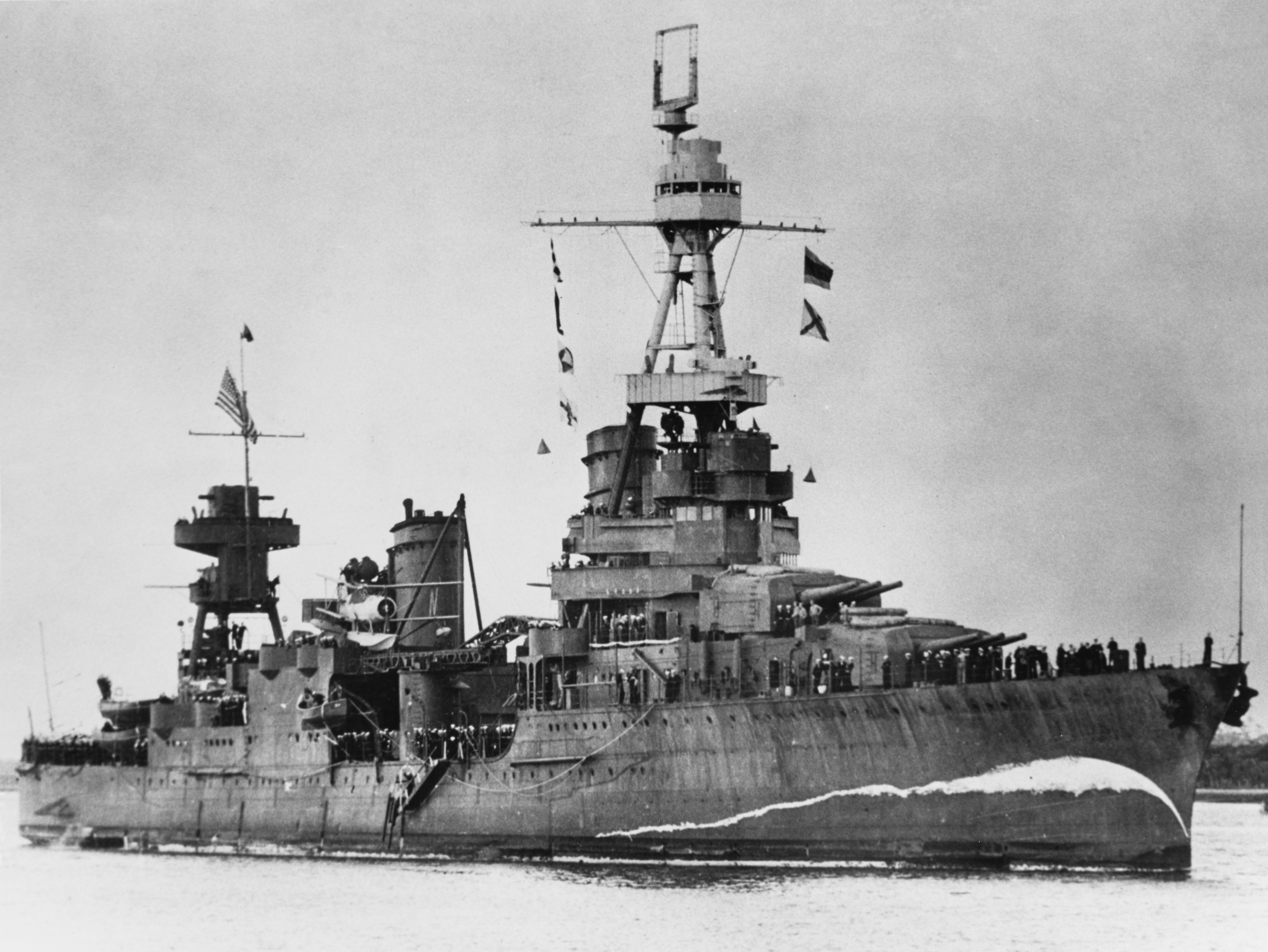
USS Northampton wearing Measure 5, a false bow wave

=== Aircraft ===
In 1940, the US Navy conducted experiments with dazzle-type camouflage for aircraft. The artist McClelland Barclay designed "pattern camouflage" schemes for US Navy aircraft such as the Douglas TBD Devastator and the Brewster F2A Buffalo to make it difficult for the enemy to gauge the shape and position of the aircraft. The camouflaged aircraft were flown in combat, but the effect was found not to be satisfactory.

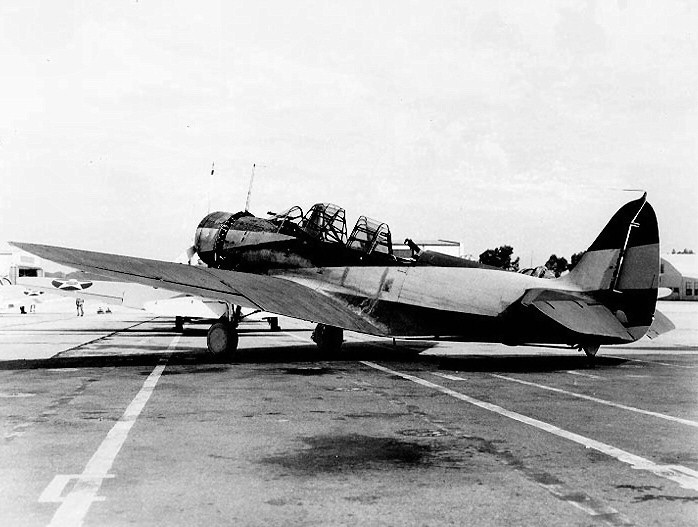
US Navy Douglas TBD Devastator in experimental "pattern camouflage" by McClelland Barclay, 1940

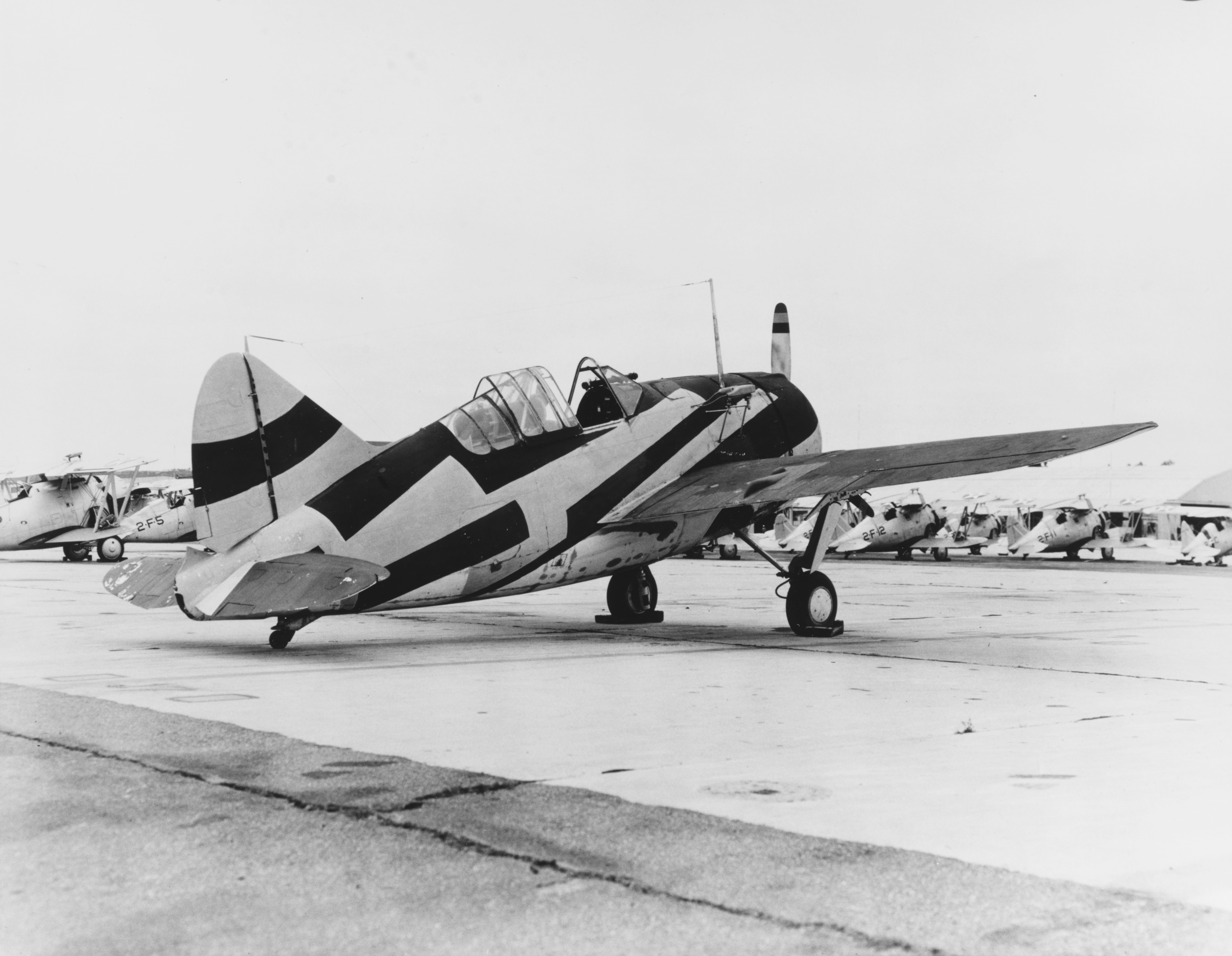
US Navy Brewster F2A Buffalo in experimental camouflage, 1940

== Since World War II ==
=== Renewed naval use ===
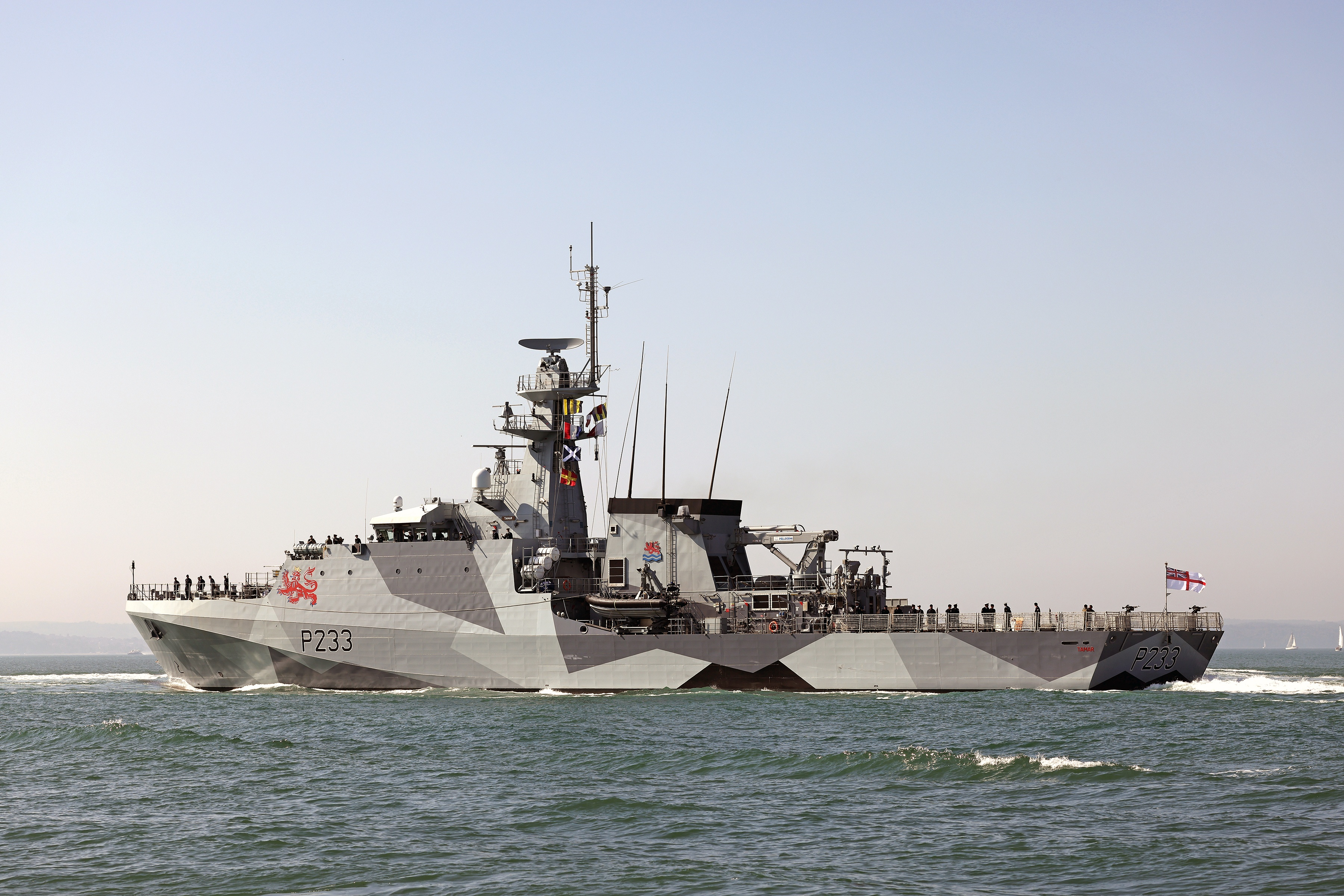
HMS Tamar (P233) painted in the 2021 Royal Navy version of dazzle camouflage

The Swedish Navy's Visby-class corvettes entered service from 2002 with a grey dazzle scheme to complement their stealth technologies. In 2019, the Royal Canadian Navy frigate HMCS Regina was painted in a 1944 pattern to commemorate the 75th anniversary of the Battle of the Atlantic; the pattern was described variously as "dazzle" and "disruptive". In 2021, the Royal Navy painted HMS Tamar, a River-class offshore patrol vessel, in patches of black and four shades of grey. It described this as "dazzle camouflage", making the ship the first Royal Navy vessel to have a paint scheme with this intention since the Second World War. A senior officer stated that although the scheme "still had value in littoral environments when viewed against the background of land", it was "more about supporting the unique identity of the squadron". Her four sister-vessels have since received similar treatment, most recently HMS Medway, which was repainted in dazzle camouflage after a refit in 2025.

For concealment purposes, the United States Navy littoral combat ship, USS Freedom, used the "Measure 32" paint scheme during a deployment to Singapore in 2013. It was also reported that during the Russian invasion of Ukraine, the Russian Navy painted "dark stripes on its warships to make them look smaller and confuse Ukrainian drones".

=== Arts ===
During the First World War

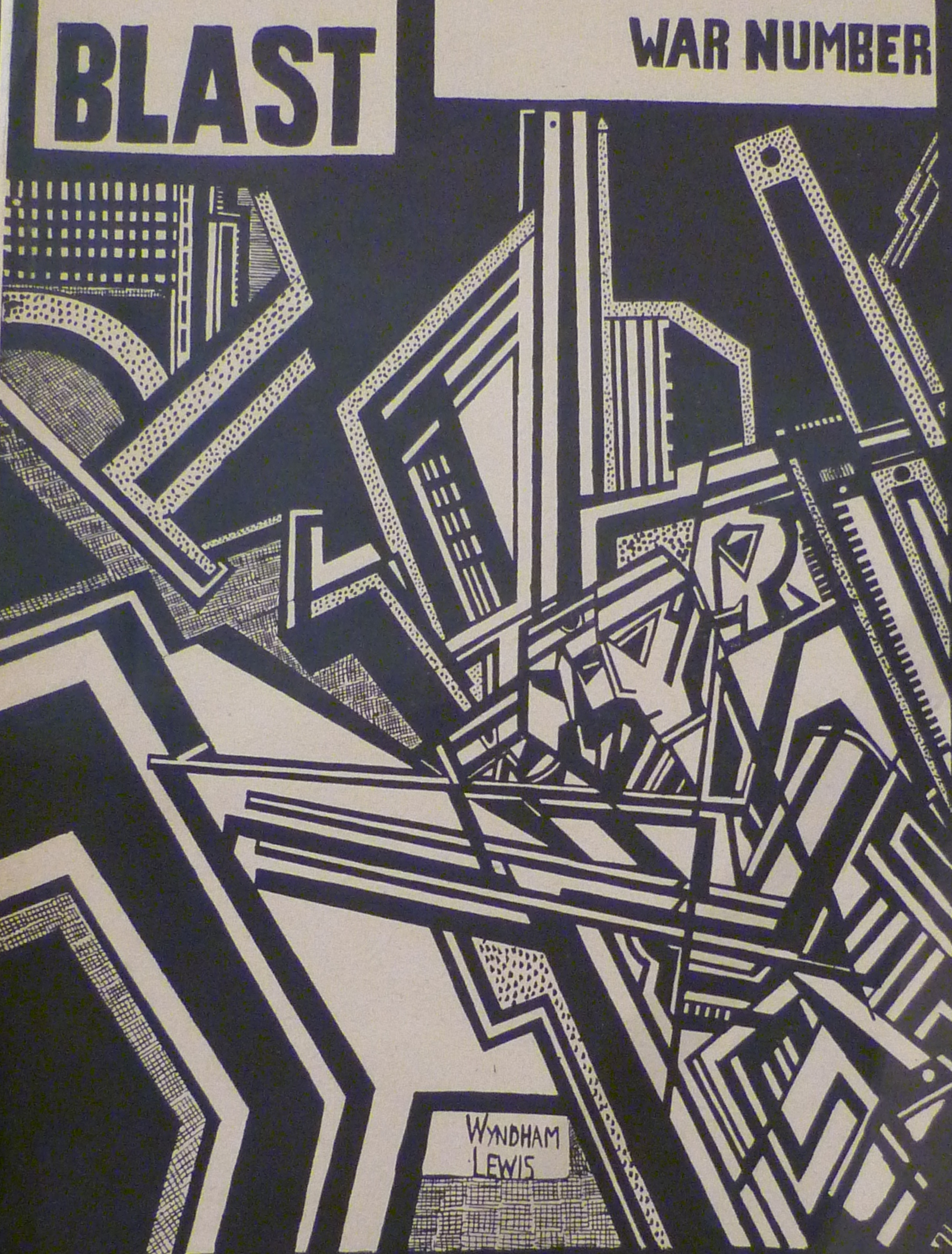
Dazzle has been compared to contemporary Vorticist art, here the cover of Blast by Wyndham Lewis, 1915

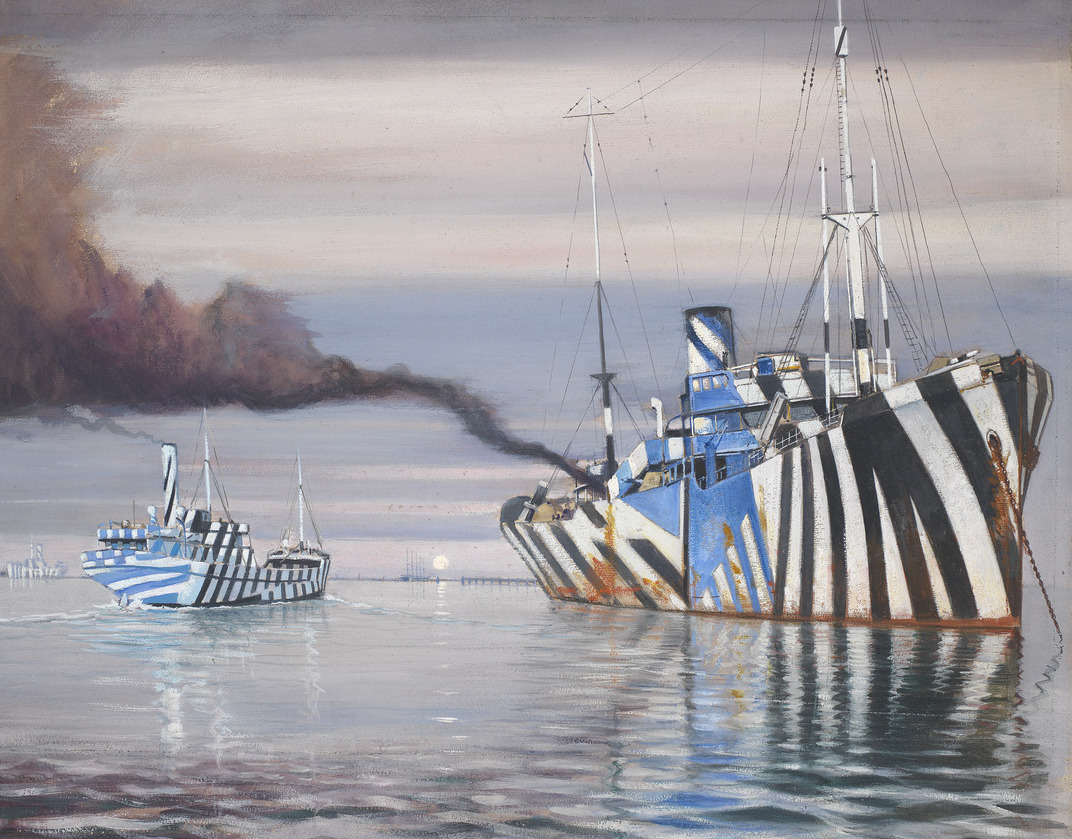
Two American ships in dazzle camouflage, painted by Burnell Poole, 1918

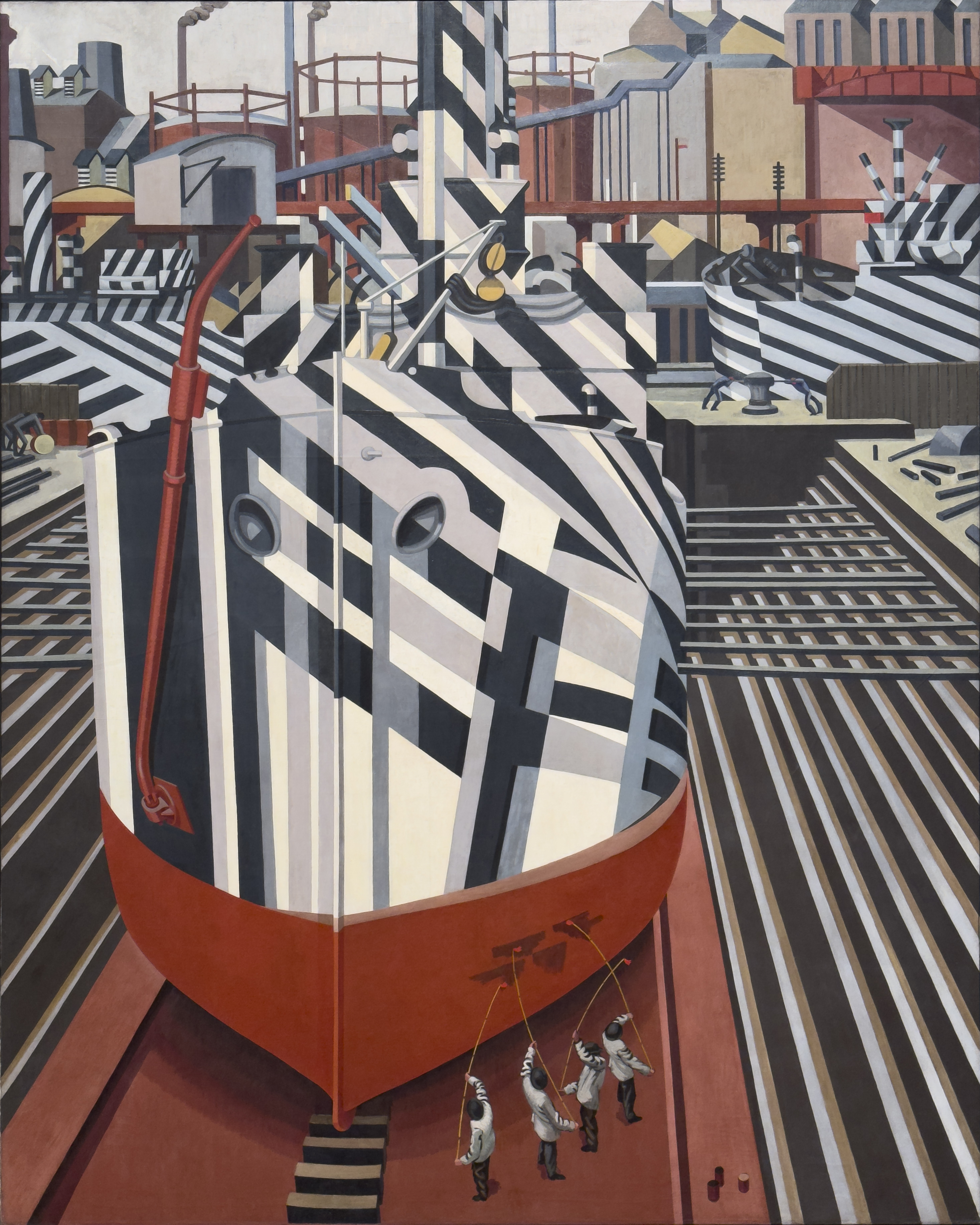
Dazzle-ships in Drydock at Liverpool, by Edward Wadsworth, 1919

The abstract patterns in dazzle camouflage inspired artists including Picasso. He claimed credit for camouflage experiments, which seemed to him a quintessentially Cubist technique. In a conversation with Gertrude Stein shortly after he first saw a painted cannon trundling through the streets of Paris he remarked, "Yes it is we who made it, that is cubism". In Britain, Edward Wadsworth, who supervised dazzle camouflage painting in the war, created a series of canvases after the war based on his dazzle work on ships. His work later inspired Peter Saville's cover and the title of Orchestral Manoeuvres in the Dark's 1983 album Dazzle Ships. In Canada, Arthur Lismer used dazzle ships in some of his wartime compositions. In America, Burnell Poole painted canvases of United States Navy ships in dazzle camouflage at sea. The historian of camouflage Peter Forbes comments that the ships had a Modernist look, their designs succeeding as avant-garde or Vorticist art.

In 2007, the art of camouflage, including the evolution of dazzle, was featured as the theme for a show at the Imperial War Museum. In 2009, the Fleet Library at the Rhode Island School of Design exhibited its rediscovered collection of lithographic printed plans for the camouflage of American World War I merchant ships, in an exhibition titled "Bedazzled".

In 2013, Phil Coy was commissioned to design the facade of Lewisham's Glass Mill leisure centre in South East London. His design "Razzle Dazzle Boogie Woogie" collapses the principles of Dazzle camouflage with those of Piet Mondrian's seminal painting Broadway Boogie Woogie into a digital camouflage design that covers the buildings facade.

In 2014, the Centenary Art Commission backed three dazzle camouflage installations in Britain: Carlos Cruz-Diez covered the pilot ship MV Edmund Gardner in Liverpool's Canning Dock with bright multi-coloured dazzle artwork, as part of the city's 2014 Liverpool Biennial art festival; and Tobias Rehberger painted HMS President, anchored since 1922 at Blackfriars Bridge in London, to commemorate the use of dazzle, a century on. Peter Blake was commissioned to design exterior paintwork for MV Snowdrop, a Mersey Ferry, which he called "Everybody Razzle Dazzle", combining his trademark motifs (stars, targets etc.) with First World War dazzle designs.

Later commemoration

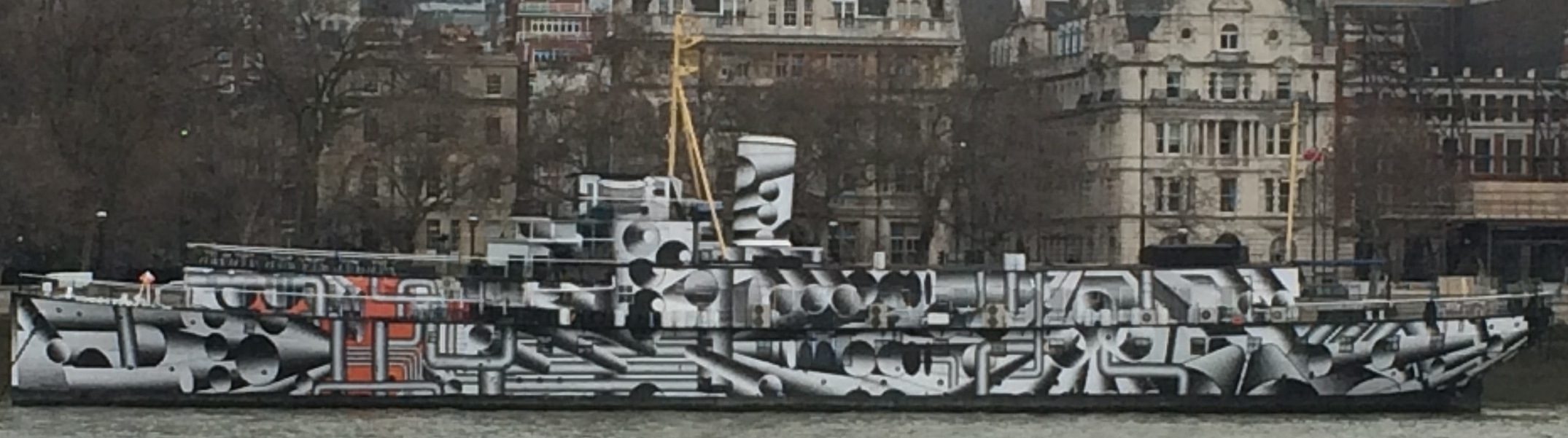
HMS President, painted by Tobias Rehberger in 2014

=== Other uses ===
In civilian life, patterns reminiscent of dazzle camouflage are sometimes used to mask a test car during trials, to make determining its exterior design difficult. During the 2015 Formula 1 testing period, the Red Bull RB11 car was painted in a scheme intended to confound rival teams' ability to analyse its aerodynamics.

The Sea Shepherd Conservation Society has used dazzle patterns on its fleet since 2009 for recognition rather than camouflage.

English football team Manchester United used a football kit during the 2020–21 season that resembled a dazzle design.

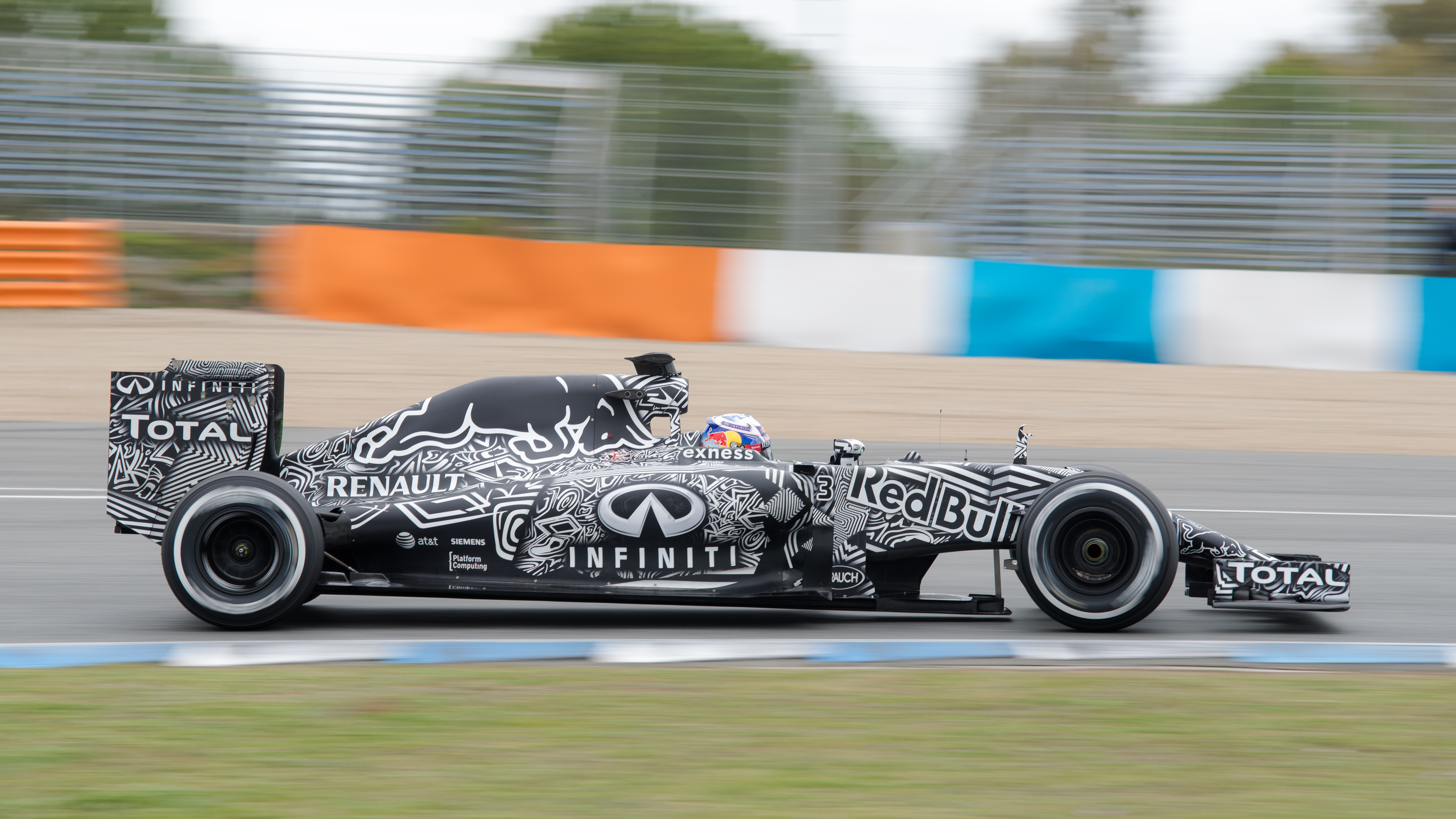
Red Bull RB11 racing car in camouflage livery

=== Russian invasion of Ukraine ===
In late May 2026 images appeared on social media showing Russian Ural and KAMAZ trucks painted in the classic dazzle camouflage. Supposedly the unusual paint scheme is to confuse Ukrainian drones controlled by artificial intelligence and disrupt their pattern recognition, and not to trick the human eye. Ukraine has experimented with AI for targeting as seen in Operation Spiderweb, and is conducting a deep strike campaign to disrupt Russian logistics.

== See also ==
- Lozenge camouflage

== Sources ==
- Forbes, Peter (2009). Dazzled and Deceived: Mimicry and Camouflage. Yale University Press. ISBN 978-0-300-17896-8.
- Rankin, Nicholas (2008). Churchill's Wizards: The British Genius for Deception 1914-1945. Faber and Faber. ISBN 978-0-571-22196-7.
- Williams, David (2001). Naval camouflage, 1914–1945: a complete visual reference. Naval Institute Press. ISBN 978-1-55750-496-8.
