= McClelland Barclay =

American illustrator (1891–1943)

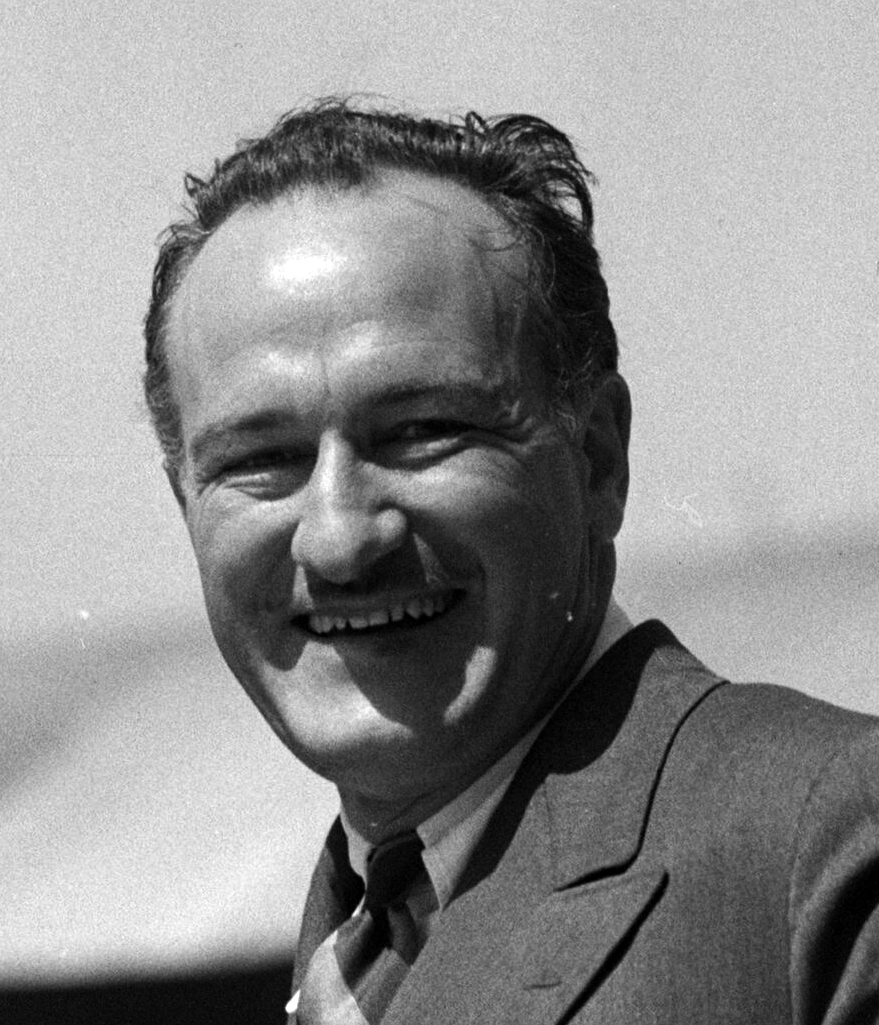
- Barclay in 1933
- Born: May 9, 1891; St. Louis, Missouri, US
- Died: July 18, 1943 (aged 51–52) at sea near the Solomon Islands
- Burial place: Lost at sea
- Military career
- Allegiance: United States
- Branch: Navy
- Service years: 1938–1943
- Rank: Lt. Commander

McClelland Barclay (9 May 1891 – 18 July 1943) was an American illustrator. By the age of 21, Barclay's work had been published in The Saturday Evening Post, Ladies' Home Journal, and Cosmopolitan. He was commissioned as a lieutenant in the Naval Reserve in 1938 and following the Japanese attack on Pearl Harbor he went on active duty. At the time of his death, in 1943, he was a Lt. Commander.

== Early life and education ==
Barclay was born in St. Louis in 1891. His mother died when he was 17, and he was sent to Washington, DC, to live with his aunt and uncle, Edward and Lucy McClelland, after whom he had been named. He studied first at the Art Institute of Chicago, and later at the Art Students League in New York City, where he studied figure drawing with George Bridgman and illustration with Thomas Fogarty. Barclay also attended the St. Louis School of Fine Arts (now the Sam Fox School of Design & Visual Arts at Washington University in St. Louis); there he studied under the school's founder, Halsey Ives. He was also a student in the Corcoran School of Art in Washington DC.

== Artwork ==
During World War I, Barclay was awarded a prize by the Committee on National Preparedness in 1917 for his poster "Fill the Breach." The next year, he designed naval camouflage under the direction of William Mackay, Chief of the New York District of the Emergency Fleet Corporation.

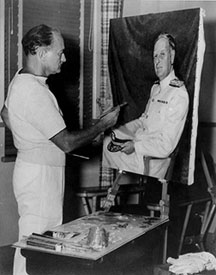
McClelland Barclay painting a portrait of Husband E. Kimmel

During the 1920s and 1930s, Barclay's images were selected for use by art directors for the nation's most popular periodicals including Collier's, Country Gentleman, Redbook, Pictorial Review, Coronet, Country Life, The Saturday Evening Post, The Ladies' Home Journal, Cosmopolitan, and a host of movie magazines. During the 1930s, he began painting movie poster art for Hollywood studios, including Paramount Pictures and Twentieth Century Fox. Barclay was considered a superstar in the film industry during the late 1930s and early 1940s. Barclay was one of the first artists to paint World War II pin-up girl, Betty Grable.

In 1930, the General Motors Corporation selected Barclay's "Fisher Body Girl" for a series of advertisements, and she quickly became as popular as "The Gibson Girl" and "The Christy Girl". He used his second wife Helene, 19 years old, as the model for the iconic Fisher Autobody image. Helene later appeared in magazine advertisements and was so well published with her languid body plastered across the country on billboards, that she was recognized wherever she went. He also illustrated advertisements for A&P, Eaton Paper Company, Elgin Watches, Humming Bird Hosiery, and Lever Brothers, amongst others. He also illustrated advertisements for Whitman's Chocolates, Texaco, and Camel and Chesterfield brand cigarettes. Because Barclay was known for his illustrations of "striking women", he earned a judging position at the Miss America 1935 pageant.

His posters and camouflage designs earned him Naval commission.

Barclay was a member of the Art Students League, the Chicago Art Club, the Society of Illustrators, the Association of Arts and Industries, and the Artists Guild.

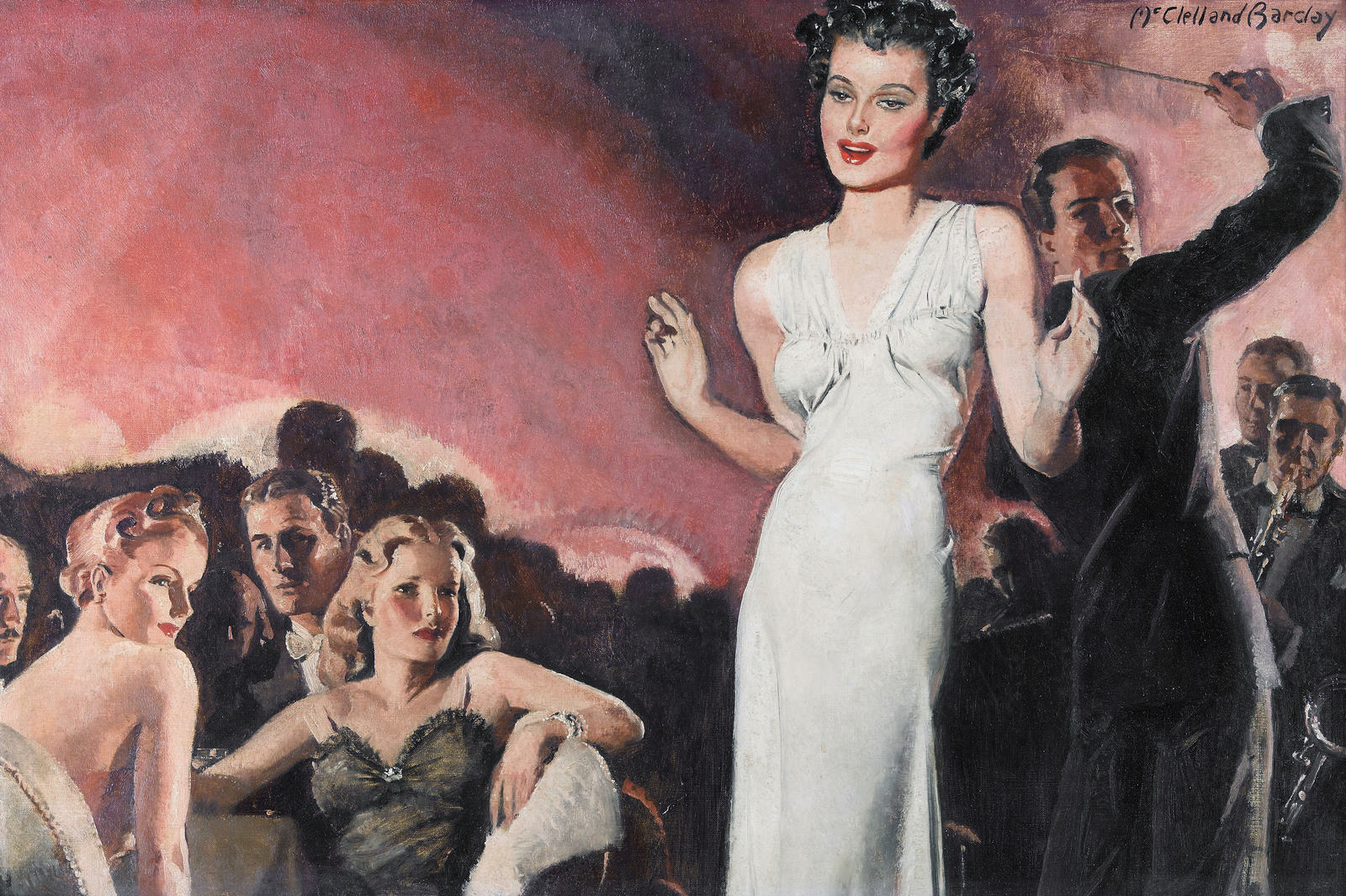
The Nightclub Singer

Barclay did not limit himself to painting. In the late 1930s, he set up a small company to reproduce jewelry and fabricate utilitarian figures for ashtrays, bookends, desk sets, lamps, and other articles for home and office use. These products were fabricated out of cast grey metal with a thick bronze plate finish and they retailed for just a few dollars. The company, which he named the McClelland Barclay Arts Products Corporation, made him little money.

In 1944, a year after his death, Barclay was awarded the Art Directors Club Medal, "in recognition of his long and distinguished record in editorial illustration and advertising art and in honor of his devotion and meritorious service to his country as a commissioned officer of the United States Navy." He was also posthumously inducted in the Society of Illustrators' Hall of Fame.

== US Naval service ==
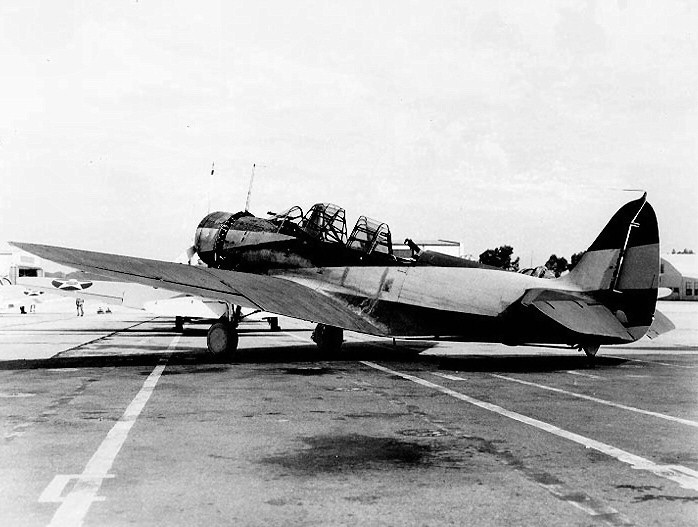
Experimental camouflage by McCelland Barclay (1940)

In June 1938, he was appointed Assistant Naval Constructor with the US Naval Reserve. In mid-1940, Barclay prepared experimental dazzle camouflage designs for Navy combat aircraft, but evaluation tests revealed that pattern camouflage was of little use for aircraft. Following the Japanese attack on Pearl Harbor, Barclay completed the first of many recruiting posters for the Navy.

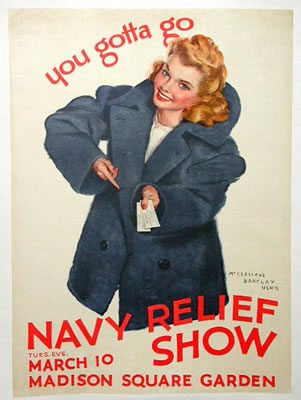
Navy Relief show poster by Barclay (1943).

On October 19, 1940, Barclay reported for active duty. He served in the New York Recruiting office, illustrating posters for the next two and a half years. These images would become some of the most recognizable recruiting images of World War II. Barclay was determined to be a front-line combat artist. In March 1943, he told the San Francisco Examiner, "A camera cannot catch the human element of a fight, the sweat and blood and courage our boys expend every time they face the enemy." In 1941 he volunteered for this position, but was rejected. Eventually he would serve in both the Atlantic and Pacific theaters on the USS Arkansas (BB-33), USS Pennsylvania (BB-38), USS Honolulu (CL-48), and the USS Maryland (BB-46).

Promoted to Lt. Commander, Barclay worked on further assignments until July 18, 1943, when he was reported as missing in action. The USS LST-342 he was aboard was torpedoed in the Solomon Islands. On board, sketching and taking photographs at the time, Barclay's body was not recovered.

Barclay was awarded the Purple Heart Medal posthumously. He was also awarded the American Defense Service Medal, Fleet Clasp; the Asiatic-Pacific Area Campaign Medal; the American Area Campaign Medal; and the World War II Victory Medal.

== Personal life ==
Barclay's first wife was Nan McClelland, his niece who was 8 years his senior. Barclay did not smoke or drink and boxed to keep in shape; Nan drank, smoked and loved parties. They grew apart and divorced in February 1930. Barclay then became engaged to his second wife, Helene Haskins. She was 20 and he was 39 – they later divorced. After his divorce with Helene, Barclay was briefly engaged to Virginia Moore, a 22-year old model, in 1937.

== Institutions with his works ==
- Pritzker Military Museum & Library
- U.S. Navy
- Corewell Health Downtown, Grand Rapids, MI

== See also ==
- Adventurers' Club of New York
