= Francis Elgar =

- Born: 24 April 1845
- Died: 17 January 1909 (aged 63)
- Education: Glasgow University
- Occupation: Naval architect

Prof Francis Elgar FRS FRSE LLD (1845 – 17 January 1909), naval architect, born at Portsmouth on 24 April 1845, was eldest son of nine children of Francis Ancell Elgar, who was employed at Portsmouth dockyard, by his wife Susanna Chalkley.

== Life ==
At fourteen Elgar was apprenticed as a shipwright in Portsmouth dockyard, where his general education was continued at an excellent school for apprentices maintained by the admiralty. There he won a scholarship entitling him to advanced instruction. In 1864, when the admiralty, with the science and art department, established the Royal School of Naval Architecture and Marine Engineering at South Kensington, Elgar was appointed, after a competitive examination among shipwright apprentices in the dockyards, one of eight students of naval architecture. After the three years' course, he in May 1867 graduated as a first-class fellow, the highest class of diploma. Of much literary ability, he long helped as an old student in the publication of the school's 'Annual'. From 1867 to 1871 Elgar was a junior officer of the shipbuilding department of the royal navy, and was employed at the dockyards and in private establishments.

Leaving the public service in 1871, Elgar became chief professional assistant to Sir Edward James Reed, who was practising in London as a consulting naval architect. At the same time he helped Reed in the production of the quarterly review entitled 'Naval Science.' General manager of Earle's shipbuilding and engineering company at Hull (1874–76), he practised as a naval architect in London (1876–79). From 1879 to 1881 he was in Japan as adviser upon naval construction to the Japanese government, and from 1881 to 1886 resumed private practice in London, advising leading steamship companies on designs of new ships, but specially investigating the causes of loss of, or accident to, important vessels. His reports on the Austral, which foundered in Sydney harbour in 1881, and the Daphne, which capsized when being launched on the Clyde in 1883, made him a leading authority on the stability of merchant ships. Elgar also served in 1883 on a departmental committee of the Board of Trade whose report formed the basis of subsequent legislation and of the regulations for fixing the maximum load-line for seagoing merchant ships of all classes and of most nationalities.

In 1883 Elgar was appointed to the first professorship of naval architecture to be established in a university; it was founded at Glasgow by the widow of John Elder, the marine engineer. Although permitted to continue private practice, Elgar during the next three years mainly devoted himself to the organisation of the new school. His personal reputation secured the sympathy of shipowners and shipbuilders, and attracted many students. In 1886 Elgar on the invitation of the admiralty re-entered the public service as Director of Dockyards, a newly created office. During his six years' control, work in the dockyards was done more economically and rapidly than before. Resigning this appointment in 1892, he was until 1907 consulting naval architect and director of the Fairfield Shipbuilding and Engineering Company of Glasgow. The company, founded by John Elder and developed by Sir William Pearce, fully maintained its position during Elgar's management. The works were enlarged and improved, and their productive capacity increased. Novel types of vessels were designed and built, including torpedo-boat destroyers and cross-Channel steamers of high speed. Steam turbines and water-tube boilers were employed at an early date, with satisfactory results.

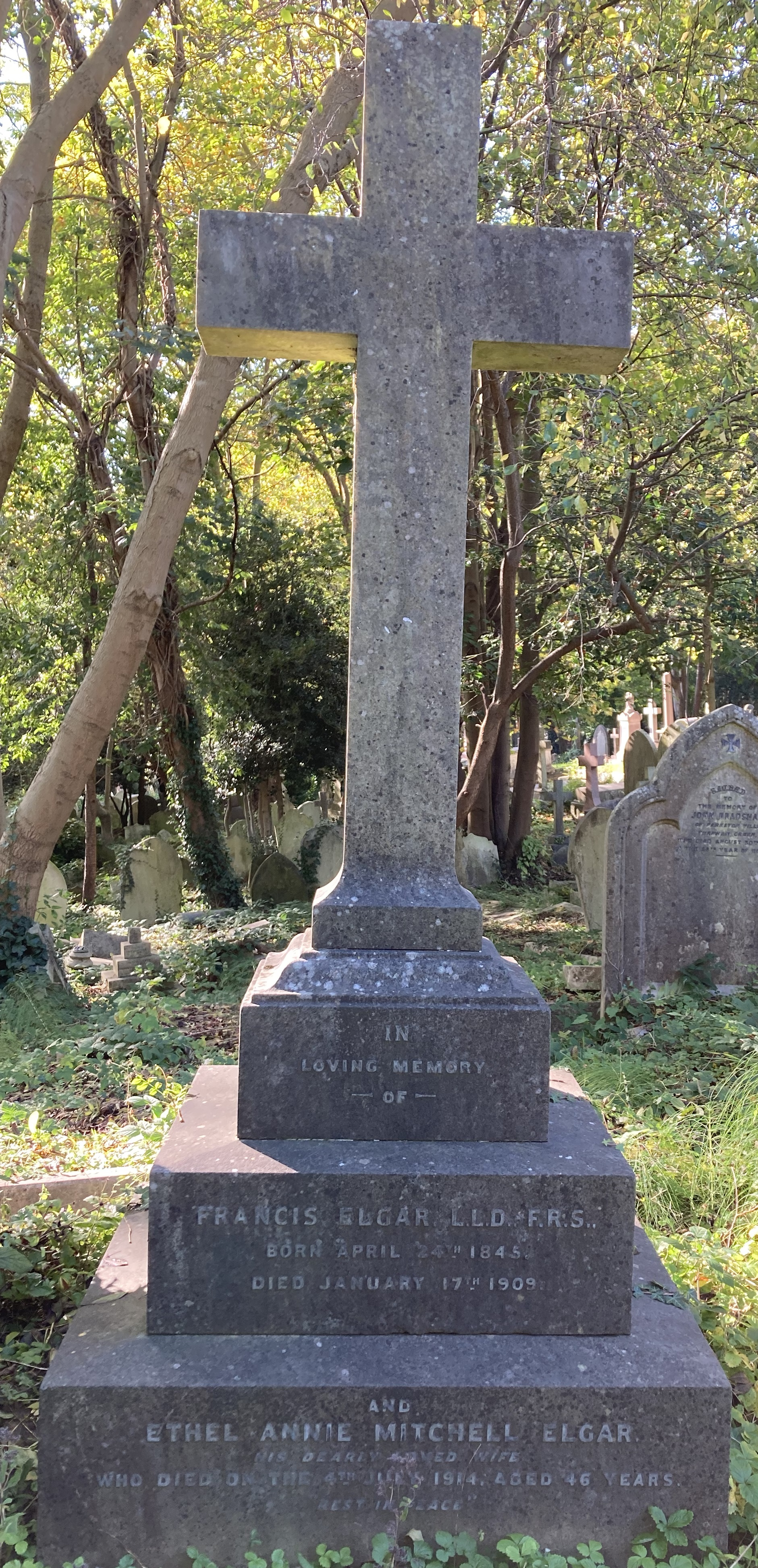
Grave of Francis Elgar in Highgate Cemetery

In 1908, after voluntarily retiring from Fairfield with a view to rest, Elgar, at the request of friends interested in the business, undertook as chairman the reorganisation of the firm of Cammell, Laird & Co. of Birkenhead and Sheffield, whose operations embraced steel and armour manufacture as well as shipbuilding and engineering. Soon after he became in addition chairman of the Fairfield company, which had intimate relations with Cammell, Laird & Co. Elgar's efforts proved successful, but the strain told on his health. Combining a wide range of scientific knowledge with practical and commercial capacity, Elgar was made hon. LL.D. of Glasgow University in 1885; F.R.S. Edinburgh soon after, and F.R.S. London in 1895. To the Royal Society's Proceedings he contributed important papers on problems of stability and strength of ships. Of the Institution of Naval Architects, of which he was a member from the outset of his career, he served on the council for twenty-six years, was treasurer for seven years, and finally was an honorary vice-president. His chief contributions to technical literature are in the 'Transactions' of the institution, and include valuable papers on Losses of Ships at Sea, on Fast Ocean Steamships, and on The Cost and Relative Power of Warships, and problems of strength and stability of ships. A member of the Institution of Civil Engineers for twenty-five years, Elgar sat on the council for six years, and as James Forrest Lecturer in 1907 delivered an address on 'Unsolved Problems in the Design and Propulsion of Ships'. He also served on the council of the Royal Society of Arts and was a royal commissioner for the international exhibitions at Paris (1889) and Chicago (1894). His interests were wide outside professional matters. Literature always attracted him. He was elected F.S.A. in 1896, and from 1904 he served as a member of the Tariff Commission.

He died suddenly at Monte Carlo on 17 January 1909, and was returned to Britain for burial on the eastern side of Highgate Cemetery in London.

== Family ==
In 1889 he married Ethel Colls, daughter of John Howard Colls of London, who survived him. They had no children.

== Legacy ==
Elgar founded a scholarship for students of naval architecture at the Institution of Naval Architects, and provided for its future maintenance by his will. He also made large bequests to the Institution of Naval Architects and the department of naval architecture in Glasgow University. He was posthumously inducted into the Scottish Engineering Hall of Fame in 2022.

== Publications ==
He published in 1875 an illustrated book on The Ships of the Royal Navy, and as president of the London dining club called the "Sette of Odd Volumes" (1894–95) he privately printed a paper on the earlier history of shipbuilding.

- Elgar, Francis; Mitchell, W. F. The Royal navy; in a series of illustrations, lithographed in colours. From original drawings. Ships of the Royal navy. Vol. 1, 1872, volume 2, 1881. Griffin & Co.
