= Burnell Poole =

American painter

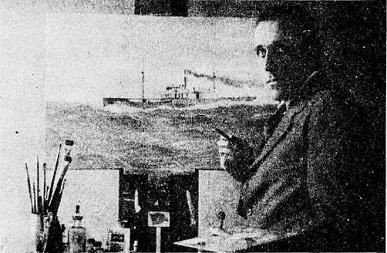
Burnell Poole at work on a naval painting in 1920

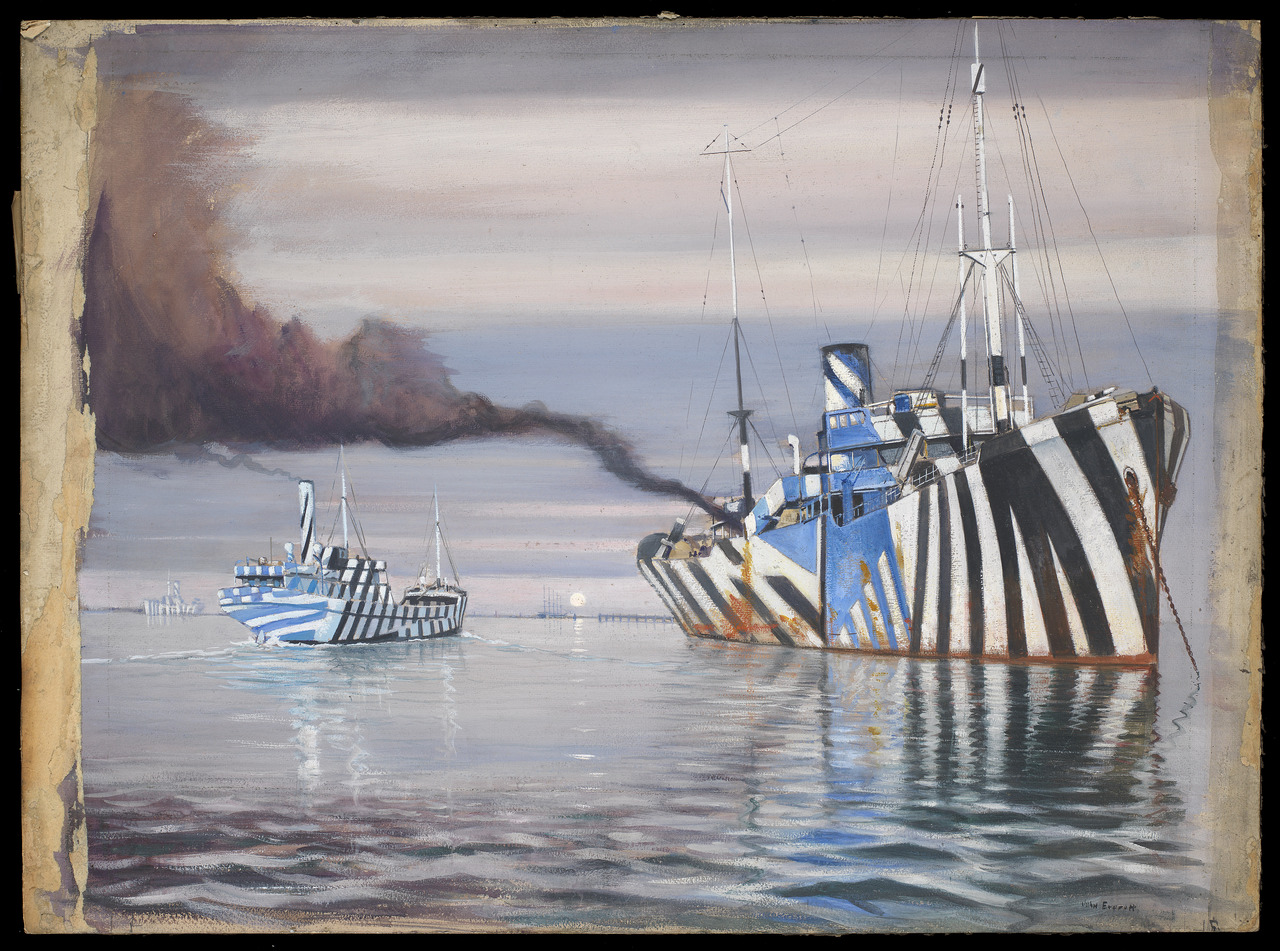
Ships in dazzle camouflage, painted by Burnell Poole, 1918

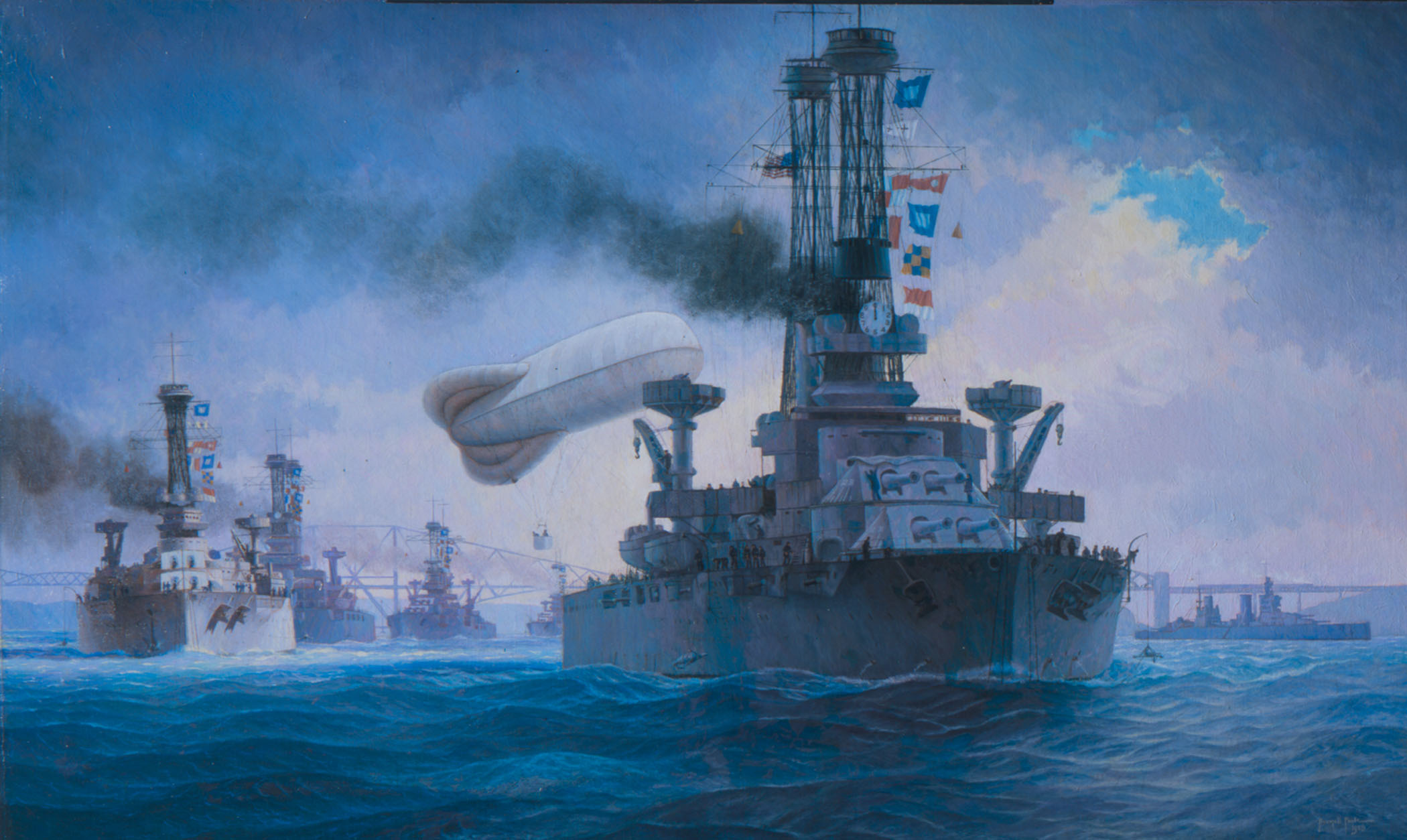
The 6th Battle Squadron of the Grand Fleet Leaving the Firth of Forth in 1918

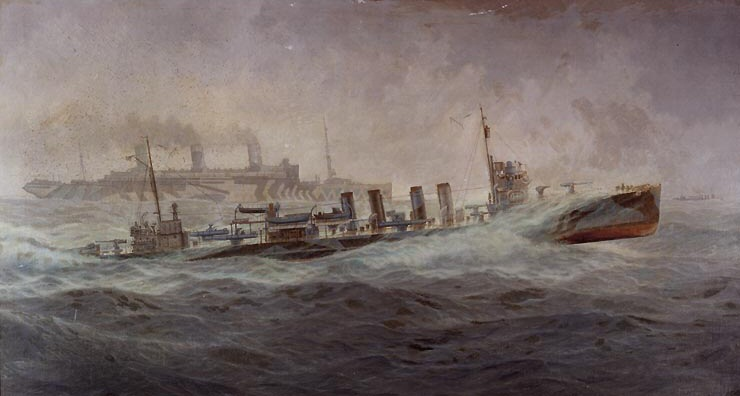
A Fast Convoy: USS Leviathan escorted by USS Allen. 1920s

Burnell Poole (30 August 1884 – 1933) was an American naval artist.

== Early life ==
Burnell Poole was born in Boston, Massachusetts. He married in 1920 to his only wife, Constance; they had a son, Burnell Poole Jr., in 1924.

== Naval Artist ==
During the First World War he took hundreds of photographs of the work of US Navy shipyards. Poole was commissioned by the Navy as a war artist to paint oil canvases of warships at sea. Many of these were unfinished on his death in 1939, and some were destroyed in a warehouse fire, but the remainder provide a view of the ships of the time and their dazzle camouflage. He painted a variety of canvases of scenes of ships in action, including of the destroyer USS Allen escorting the troopship USS Leviathan. Describing one of these paintings, now held by the Naval Historical Foundation, the artist commented that "This painting depicts the U.S. Destroyer Allen escorting the troop transport Leviathan through the danger zone on a typical dull day in the North Atlantic in rough weather. The visibility is fair", and "Under such conditions the Leviathan made about 23 or 24 knots necessitating 25 or 26 [knots] for the destroyer on account of her independent zigzag course."

In 1918 he visited the British Isles as naval correspondent for the New York magazine Everybody's Magazine. He took the opportunity to paint images of the British fleet, becoming the Royal Navy's official artist.

== Legacy ==
Poole died at Englewood, New Jersey, in 1933. He has been described as "among the most accomplished marine artists of the first half of the 20th century"; he left many aquatints of yachts and other maritime scenes.

== See also ==
- Henry Reuterdahl
- Antonio Jacobsen
- Willy Stöwer
- William Frederick Mitchell
