= Laurence Eliot Power =

Royal Navy Admiral (1864–1927)

Admiral Sir Laurence Eliot Power, KCB, CVO (7 May 1864 – 20 January 1927) was a Royal Navy officer who played an important role in shipbuilding during the First World War.

== Biography ==
Born in Bramley, Surrey, Power was the son of the Rev. Henry Bolton Power and the grandson of Major-General Sir Manley Power. He entered HMS Britannia in July 1877, ranked seventh out of forty-six successful candidates. He was rated midshipman in 1879, sub-lieutenant in 1883, lieutenant in 1887, commander in 1899, and captain in 1905. A navigation specialist, Power served as navigator in a number of ships from 1885 to 1903, when he received his first independent command. He was awarded the Shadwell Testimonial in 1890 for the best plan of an anchorage by a junior officer.

In 1903, he was given command the sloop HMS Alert. In 1905, he was promoted to captain and attended the Royal Naval War College. In 1906, he was given command of the protected cruiser HMS Elgar, before being appointed Captain of the HM Navigation School (HMS Dryad) in 1907. He was master of the fleet at the review of the Home Fleet by Edward VII in August 1907. In 1910, he was given command of the cruiser HMS Monmouth.

In 1912, Power was appointed Captain Superintendent of Contract-built Ships, with responsibility for contract work (excluding destroyers) on the Tyne, Thames, Mersey, at Barrow-in-Furness, and at Sunderland, with headquarters at Newcastle-on-Tyne. In that role, Power played an important role in shipbuilding and ship repair efforts during the First World War. He was appointed Naval Aide-de-Camp to the King in 1915. In December 1916 he was promoted to rear-admiral. In 1917, he was appointed Director of Dockyards and Repairs (restyled Director of Dockyards after the war). In 1920, he was promoted to vice-admiral and retired, but remained Director of Dockyards until 1923. He was promoted to admiral in 1925 on the Retired List.

Power was appointed MVO in 1907, CB in 1916, promoted to CVO in 1917, and KCB in 1921.

In 1900, Power married Muriel Want, daughter of Sydney A. Want, Sydney, New South Wales; they had two daughters and a son, Admiral Sir Manley Laurence Power.
