= Brian de Courcy-Ireland =

Naval officer

Stanley Brian de Courcy-Ireland (1900–2001) was an officer in the Royal Navy, starting as a midshipman at the age of 13 and retiring as Deputy Director of Naval Equipment in 1951.

During the First World War, he served in the battle of Jutland, survived a torpedo attack by a U-boat and saw the scuttling of the German fleet at Scapa Flow. In the interwar period, he joined the Fleet Air Arm and served as an observer. During the Second World War, he saw action on HMS Newcastle in the Atlantic and Mediterranean. He then returned to naval aviation, commanding an air station, coordinating air and naval action and then serving as Director of Combined Operations for the invasion of Europe. Post-war, he commanded HMS Ajax in the Mediterranean, seeing action in the Balkans and the blockade of Palestine.

== Legacy ==
His recollection of action in the First World War is preserved as an oral history in the Imperial War Museum.

DeCourcy Ireland Circle in Ajax, Ontario is named after him.
