= Clement Greatorex =

Royal Navy Admiral (1869–1937)

Admiral Clement Greatorex CB MVO
- Born: 7 January 1869
- Died: 21 March 1937 (aged 68)
- Military career
- Allegiance: United Kingdom
- Branch: Royal Navy
- Rank: Admiral
- Commands: HMS Eclipse; HMS Natal; Shetlands
- Conflicts: First World War
- Awards: Companion of the Order of the Bath; Member of the Royal Victorian Order

Admiral Clement Greatorex CB MVO (7 January 1869 – 21 March 1937) was a Royal Navy officer.

== Naval career ==
Promoted to captain on 31 December 1905, Greatorex was given command of the protected cruiser HMS Eclipse in January 1906 and the armoured cruiser HMS Natal in June 1911. He was appointed Director of Naval Equipment at the Admiralty from 14 January 1915 to 8 October 1917. Promoted to the rank of Rear-Admiral he was then appointed Flag Officer, Shetlands in October 1917. During the First World War.
