= Department of the Director of Dockyards =

British Admiralty department

Agency overview
- Formed: 1872
- Preceding agency: Department of the Surveyor of the Navy
- Dissolved: 1964
- Superseding agency: Dockyards and Fleet Maintenance Department
- Jurisdiction: Government of the United Kingdom
- Headquarters: Admiralty London
- Agency executives: Director-General of Dockyards; Director of Dockyards; Director of Fleet Maintenance; Director of Marine Services
- Parent department: Admiralty

The Department of the Director of Dockyards, also known as the Dockyard Branch and later as the Dockyards and Fleet Maintenance Department, was the British Admiralty department responsible from 1872 to 1964 for civil administration of dockyards, the building of ships, the maintenance and repair of ships at dockyards and factories, and the supervision of all civil dockyard personnel.

== History ==
Originally, responsibility for the civil management of Royal Navy Dockyards lay with the Navy Board, and in particular the Surveyor of the Navy who supervised the Navy Board's resident commissioners of the navy based at each individual yard. Following the abolition of the Navy Board in 1832, responsibility for administration of the yards passed to the Board of Admiralty. The resident commissioners were replaced by yard superintendents, however they were primarily responsible for military administration of the yards.

The Surveyor of the Navy survived the re-organisation until 1869, when his office was merged with that of the Third Naval Lord to become Controller of the Navy. Between 1850 and 1861, the dockyards had been subject to an investigation into management practices; the committee responsible for the investigation concluded that under the existing system was completely inefficient. In 1872, to ease the burden of work on the Controller and to action reforms suggested by the inquiry, a Surveyor of Dockyards was appointed to answer these criticisms. He was originally supervised by the Director of Naval Construction, who was responsible for both design and construction, and also dockyard work.

In December 1885 the post of Surveyor of Dockyards was abolished and replaced by a Director of Dockyards. The new Director was instructed to visit the dockyards frequently, "for the purpose of conferring personally with the superintendents and officers in regard to the ships and works in progress." However, inefficiencies led to a recommendation by George Robinson, Lord Ripon in which he suggested there should be a separation of the functions and duties of the naval design and construction branches, which would remain distinct from each other, and that the branches should both coordinate and operate a sort of checks and balance system. A set of instructions issued on 28 May 1886 communicated that the Director of Dockyards would no longer be subordinate to the Director of Naval Construction. Instead, he was made solely responsible to the Controller for the building of ships at dockyards, and for the maintenance and repair of ships, of boats, and of all steam machinery in ships, boats, dockyards, and factories. In 1892 the post of Director of Dockyards was changed to Director of Dockyards and Works until 1913, when it was again renamed to Director of Dockyards and Repair.

During and after World War One, from 1917 to 1919, further restructuring with the Admiralty took place with the creation of the post of Deputy Controller for Dockyards and Shipbuilding, to which the Director of Dockyards and Repairs would now report to. The department under this name would remain in place until 1957, when it was renamed Dockyards and Fleet Maintenance Department under the control of a director-general until 1964. Following the merger of the Admiralty into a new and much larger Ministry of Defence under the Navy Department, it was again renamed as the Department of Dockyards and Maintenance until 1968. In 1969, overall responsibility for dockyards changed, and now came under the control of a new Chief Executive, Royal Dockyards. who was head of the Royal Dockyards Management Board.

== Duties ==
A director's duties included:

- assisting the Controller in the preparation of the estimates for plant and machinery required for all naval establishments;
- exercising control of naval expenditure at all home yards;
- exercising control of naval expenditure at all overseas yards;
- general management of the dockyards at home and the naval yards abroad;
- managing the economical performance of the dockyards at home and the naval yards abroad;
- preparing annual programmes of work (subject to approval in the dockyards at home and the naval yards abroad;
- preparing of the Navy Estimates, to determine the work to be done in the dockyards;
- regulating the number, appropriation, and pay of the men, and the supply of necessary materials through the Director of Stores, in accordance with the approved shipbuilding programme;
- submitting proposals relative to necessary works to be carried out in the yards by the Department of the Director of Works;
- superintending the building of ships and boats of all classes;
- superintending the proper maintenance and repairing of ships and their machinery, and the keeping of vessels up to the approved standard; and
- supplying relevant machinery and appliances and provide instruction of the use of both in the yards and factories, as well as in the victualling yards.

== Incumbents ==
Head of Department included:

=== Surveyor of Dockyards ===
- Sir Frederick Barnes, 1872 - December 1885)

=== Director of Dockyards ===
- Sir Frederick Barnes, December 1885 - February 1886
- Dr. Francis Elgar, February 1886 - 1892

=== Director of Dockyards and Works ===
- Sir James Williamson, 1892 - July 1905)
- Sir James B. Marshall, July 1905- March 1913

=== Director of Dockyards and Repair ===
- Sir James B. Marshall, March 1913- April 1917
- Vice-Admiral Sir Laurence Eliot Power, 1 June 1917 – 31 March 1923
- Admiral Sir Brian H. F. Barttelot, March, 1923 – 1 March 1928
- Admiral Sir Albert P. Addison, 1 March 1928 – 1 May 1937
- Vice-Admiral Sir Cecil P. Talbot, 1 May 1937 – 20 December 1946
- Admiral Sir Claud B. Barry, 20 December 1946 - 31 December 1951
- Vice-Admiral Sir W. York La Roche Beverley, 31 December 1951 - 19 July 1954
- Vice-Admiral Sir A. Gordon V. Hubback, 19 July 1954 - 31 December 1957

=== Director-General of Dockyards and Maintenance ===
- Rear-Admiral, Peter D. H. R. Pelly, 2 January 1958 - December 1959
- Vice-Admiral Sir Reginald Thomas Sandars, December 1959 - 19 May 1962
- Rear-Admiral W. A. Haynes, 19 May 1962 - April 1964

Note: RADM Haynes remained as Director-General, Dockyards and Maintenance with the new Ministry of Defence from May 1964 until 1969.

== Structure of Department ==
As of Spring 1962

- Office of the Director-General Dockyards and Maintenance ---------- Office of the Civil Assistant to the Director-General Dockyards and Maintenance
  - Divisions
    - Dockyards
      - Construction Departments
      - Draughting Departments
      - Electrical Departments
      - Engineering Departments
      - Maintenance Departments
      - Salvage Departments
      - Training Sections

Dockyard Division

- Office of the Director Dockyard Division
  - Office of the Deputy Director Dockyard Division
    - Office of the Assistant Director Dockyard Division, Ships
    - Office of the Assistant Director Dockyard Division, Shore
    - Office of the Assistant Director Dockyard Division, Management Techniques
    - Office of the Assistant Director Dockyard Division, General
    - Office of the Assistant Director Dockyard Division, Nuclear
    - Office of the Assistant Director Dockyard Division, Personnel
    - Office of the Assistant Director Dockyard Division, Finance
      - Office of the Chief Constructor
      - Office of the Chief Draughtsman
      - Office of the Superintending Mechanical Engineer
      - Telecommunications Section
      - Management Training Section

Fleet Maintenance Division

- Office of the Director Fleet Maintenance Division
  - Office of the Deputy Director Fleet Maintenance Division
    - Office of the Assistant Director Fleet Maintenance Division
    - Office of the Assistant Director Fleet Maintenance Division, Constructive

Marine Services Division

- Office of the Director Marine Services Division
  - Office of the Deputy Marine Services Maintenance Division
    - Office of the Assistant Director Marine Services Division
      - Civil Staff Department (officer's responsible for boom defences, examiner of works, moorings, salvage, moorings)
        - Yard Machinery District, Scottish
        - Yard Machinery District, Northern
        - Yard Machinery District, Midland
        - Yard Machinery District, Southern

Naval Dockyards

Yards operating from 1860 onward during the existence of this department included.

- Antigua Yard.
- Ascension Yard.
- Bermuda Yard.
- Bombay Yard.
- Chatham Yard.
- Colombo Yard.
- Deptford Yard.
- Devonport Yard.
- Devonport Yard, NZ.
- Esquimalt, Yard.
- Gibraltar Yard.
- Halifax Yard.
- Haulbowline Yard.
- Invergordon Yard.
- Jamaica Yard.
- Lyness Yard.
- Madras Yard.
- Malta Yard.
- Pembroke Yard.
- Plymouth Yard.
- Portland Yard.
- Portsmouth Yard.
- Rosyth Yard.
- Scapa Flow Yard.
- Sheerness Yard.
- Simonstown Yard.
- Singapore Yard.
- Sydney Yard.
- Trincomalee Yard.
- Wei Hai Wei Yard.
- Woolwich Yard.

== Timeline ==
- Navy Board, Surveyor of the Navy, Dockyard Commissioners, 1546-1832
- Board of Admiralty, Surveyor of the Navy, Dockyard Branch, 1832-1860
- Board of Admiralty, Department of the Surveyor of Dockyards, 1872-1885
- Board of Admiralty, Department of the Director of Dockyards, 1885-1958
- Board of Admiralty, Dockyards and Maintenance Department, 1958-1964
- Ministry of Defence, Navy Department, Department of Dockyards and Maintenance, 1964-1968
- Ministry of Defence, Navy Department, Chief of Fleet Support Department, Department of Dockyards, 1969–1971.
