= List of shipwrecks in 1935 =

The list of shipwrecks in 1935 includes ships sunk, foundered, grounded, or otherwise lost during 1935.

table of contents
1935
Jan	Feb	Mar	Apr
May	Jun	Jul	Aug
Sep	Oct	Nov	Dec
Unknown date

== January ==
=== 1 January ===
List of shipwrecks: 1 January 1935
Ship	State	Description
Olivia	Estonia	The cargo ship ran aground on Naissaar. The crew were taken off on 12 January. Salvage operations were reported as having been suspended on 18 January.
Ragni	Norway	The cargo ship collided with Alku (Finland) in the Baltic Sea off Dragør, Denmark and was beached.

=== 2 January ===
List of shipwrecks: 2 January 1935
Ship	State	Description
Île de Los	France	The cargo ship, on her maiden voyage, struck rocks off Casablanca, Morocco and broke in three. All 35 crew were rescued by the Casablanca Lifeboat.
Lexington	United States	The passenger ship was rammed and sunk in the East River, New York City by Jane Christenson (United States) and sank.

=== 3 January ===
For the loss of the Norwegian cargo ship Sisto on this day, see the entry for 19 December 1934.

=== 4 January ===
List of shipwrecks: 4 January 1935
Ship	State	Description
Jean Smith	United Kingdom	The schooner was abandoned in the Atlantic Ocean 8 nautical miles (15 km) off Codroy, Newfoundland and subsequently sank.

=== 6 January ===
List of shipwrecks: 6 January 1935
Ship	State	Description
Havana	United States	The ocean liner ran aground on the Mantanilla Reef north of the Bahamas with the loss of one of the 177 people on board. Survivors were rescued by El Oceano and Peten (both United States). She was refloated on 3 March.

=== 8 January ===
List of shipwrecks: 8 January 1935
Ship	State	Description
Grosznyi	Soviet Union	The cargo ship broke in two and sank in the Black Sea (44°00′N 35°25′E).

=== 9 January ===
List of shipwrecks: 9 January 1935
Ship	State	Description
Valentine	United Kingdom	The Thames barge collided with Agon Gwili (United Kingdom) in the River Thames at East Greenwich and sank. She was later raised and beached.

=== 11 January ===
List of shipwrecks: 11 January 1935
Ship	State	Description
Kian	United Kingdom	The cargo ship ran aground at Tongzhou, China. She broke her back and was a constructive total loss.

=== 13 January ===
List of shipwrecks: 13 January 1935
Ship	State	Description
Lu	United States	The 14-gross register ton, 38.3-foot (11.7 m) fishing vessel sank in Stephens Passage in the Alexander Archipelago in Southeast Alaska. Her crew of nine survived.

=== 14 January ===
List of shipwrecks: 14 January 1935
Ship	State	Description
Neptune Second	United Kingdom	The schooner was abandoned in the Atlantic Ocean (40°35′N 28°55′W). Her crew were rescued by Wellfield (United Kingdom) and the ship was set on fire.

=== 15 January ===
List of shipwrecks: 15 January 1935
Ship	State	Description
Aghios Spyridon	United Kingdom	The cargo ship sprang a leak in the Goulet de Brest and was beached.

=== 17 January ===
List of shipwrecks: 17 January 1935
Ship	State	Description
Kenkerry	United Kingdom	The cargo ship was driven ashore in Portuguese Cove, Nova Scotia, Canada with the loss of her captain. Survivors were rescued by breeches buoy.
Ronnskar	Finland	The cargo ship came ashore north of Capo Hora in the Sea of Marmara. She was refloated on 22 January.

=== 18 January ===
List of shipwrecks: 18 January 1935
Ship	State	Description
Kenkerry	United Kingdom	The cargo ship ran aground at Halifax, Nova Scotia, Canada and broke in two. All crew were rescued by breeches buoy except for her captain, who drowned.

=== 19 January ===
List of shipwrecks: 19 January 1935
Ship	State	Description
Hurry On	United Kingdom	The coaster came ashore in Chedabucto Bay. She was refloated on 6 February.
Violette	Italy	The coaster sank at Trieste, Friuli-Venezia Giulia whilst under repair.

=== 21 January ===
List of shipwrecks: 21 January 1935
Ship	State	Description
Resolute	United States	During a gale, the 82-gross register ton, 104-foot (31.7 m) motor vessel was beached in a sinking condition and wrecked 0.5 nautical miles (0.93 km; 0.58 mi) from the entrance to Oliver's Inlet (58°08′30″N 134°19′45″W) in Stephens Passage in the Alexander Archipelago in Southeast Alaska. Her four-man crew survived and was rescued the following morning by the cutter USCGC Tallapoosa ( United States Coast Guard).

=== 22 January ===
List of shipwrecks: 22 January 1935
Ship	State	Description
Boatman	United Kingdom	The tug capsized and sank in the River Humber with the loss of one of her four crew. She was assisting in the salvage of the fishing vessel Edgar Wallace (United Kingdom) at the time.
Hokuman Maru	Japan	The cargo ship foundered in the Pacific Ocean 150 nautical miles (280 km) west of Estevan Point, British Columbia, Canada. The crew were rescued by President Jackson (United States).
Pioneer	United Kingdom	The tug foundered in the North Sea off Withernsea, Yorkshire whilst under tow.

=== 24 January ===
List of shipwrecks: 24 January 1935
Ship	State	Description
Mohawk	United States	The cargo liner collided with Talisman (Norway) in New York Harbor and sank with the loss of 46 of the 163 people on board. Survivors were rescued by Algonquin and Limon (both United States).

=== 25 January ===
List of shipwrecks: 25 January 1935
Ship	State	Description
Lochgorm	United Kingdom	The ferry ran aground at Bowmore, Islay, Inner Hebrides. She was refloated on 19 February.
Rondo	Norway	The Design 1020 cargo ship ran aground on Eileanan Glasn, off the Isle of Mull, Argyllshire, United Kingdom, while seeking shelter from a storm and sank in the Sound of Mull.

=== 26 January ===
List of shipwrecks: 26 January 1935
Ship	State	Description
Beatrice	Sweden	The auxiliary schooner came ashore south of Varberg, Halland County. All crew were rescued.
Cicelia	United Kingdom	The ketch broke free from her moorings at St. Ives, Cornwall. She broke up on Pednolva Rocks; the crew were ashore at time.
Maria di Pompei	Italy	The sailing ship was in collision with Alhama (United Kingdom) in the Tyrrhenian Sea 5 nautical miles (9.3 km) off Naples, Campania and sank. All crew were rescued by Alhama.

=== 27 January ===
List of shipwrecks: 27 January 1935
Ship	State	Description
Hjorthjolm	Denmark	The cargo ship collided with Clan Macdougall (United Kingdom) at Swansea, Glamorgan, United Kingdom and was beached.
Harold Margett	United Kingdom	The Thames barge foundered in the Thames Estuary north of Sheerness, Kent with the loss of both crew.

=== 28 January ===
List of shipwrecks: 28 January 1935
Ship	State	Description
Viola	United States	During a voyage from Craig to Waterfall, Territory of Alaska, the 10-ton, 32-foot (9.8 m) fishing vessel became stranded on rocks and foundered at San Fernando Island about 10 nautical miles (19 km) southwest of Craig during a gale, becoming a total loss. Her two-man crew survived.

=== 29 January ===
List of shipwrecks: 29 January 1935
Ship	State	Description
Silveryew	United Kingdom	The cargo liner ran aground at the entrance to Halifax Harbour, Nova Scotia, Canada. The passengers were put ashore. She was refloated on 4 February.

=== 30 January ===
List of shipwrecks: 30 January 1935
Ship	State	Description
Chita Maru	Japan	The cargo ship foundered in the South China Sea off Sasebo, Nagasaki. All crew survived.

=== Unknown date ===
List of shipwrecks: Unknown date in January 1935
Ship	State	Description
Boug	Soviet Union	The ship was driven ashore and damaged. She was later refloated.

== February ==
=== 2 February ===
List of shipwrecks: 2 February 1935
Ship	State	Description
Tungchow	United Kingdom	The cargo ship was seized by pirates at the mouth of the Yangtze, China. She was taken to Honghai Bay and abandoned. One of the crew was killed.
Ville de Lyon	France	The coaster ship sank in the Rhône at Port-Saint-Louis-du-Rhône, Bouches du Rhône. All three crew were rescued by the tug Artois (France).

=== 4 February ===
List of shipwrecks: 4 February 1935
Ship	State	Description
West Vancouver No.5	United Kingdom	The cargo ship collided with Princess Alice (United Kingdom) at Vancouver, British Columbia, Canada and sank.

=== 5 February ===
List of shipwrecks: 5 February 1935
Ship	State	Description
Fro	Norway	The cargo ship sank off Folda, Nord-Trøndelag, Norway with the loss of her pilot. The crew were rescued by Sakko (Soviet Union).

=== 7 February ===
List of shipwrecks: 7 February 1935
Ship	State	Description
Dipping V	Netherlands	The cargo ship collided with Fior D'Arancio (Italy) in the North Sea off Cuxhaven, Germany. Both ships were beached. Both vessels were refloated the next day. Dipping V was towed to Hamburg for repairs. Fior D'Arancio proceeded to Gdynia, Poland.

=== 8 February ===
List of shipwrecks: 8 February 1935
Ship	State	Description
Cape May	United States	The ferry collided with London Corporation (United Kingdom) in the Delaware River and was beached. She was refloated on 14 March.
Ming Kong	China	The cargo ship struck a rock and sank in the Yangtze 10 nautical miles (19 km) upstream of Hankow. All crew survived.
Record Reign	United Kingdom	The coaster came ashore 2 nautical miles (3.7 km) west of Branscombe, Dorset. She broke up on 22 February and was a total loss.

=== 9 February ===
List of shipwrecks: 9 February 1935
Ship	State	Description
Aghios Spyridon	Greece	The cargo ship ran aground in the Euripus Strait. She was refloated on 16 February.

=== 12 February ===
List of shipwrecks: 12 February 1935
Ship	State	Description
Martha Hendrik Fisser	Germany	The cargo ship ran aground on Storfosen, Trondheimsfjord, Norway. All 30 crew were rescued. She was refloated on 23 February and beached. Martha Hendrik Fisser was subsequently towed to Trondheim, Norway, where she arrived on 6 March.

=== 14 February ===
List of shipwrecks: 14 February 1935
Ship	State	Description
Delphin IV	Germany	The auxiliary schooner ran aground at Cape Arkona, Rügen, Germany. She was refloated on 18 February.
Mount Parnes	Greece	The cargo ship ran aground at Corcubión, Galicia, Spain. She developed a list, broke in tow and sank the next day.
Spec	Norway	The cargo ship departed from the Clyde, United Kingdom for Boston, Massachusetts, United States. No further trace, presumed foundered in the Atlantic Ocean with the loss of all hands.

=== 15 February ===
List of shipwrecks: 15 February 1935
Ship	State	Description
Staghound	United Kingdom	The coaster ran aground at the entrance to Ayr harbour. All ten crew were rescued. She was refloated on 20 February.

=== 16 February ===
List of shipwrecks: 16 February 1935
Ship	State	Description
Riverville	United Kingdom	The coaster ran aground at Walney Island, Lancashire in a storm. All seven crew were rescued by breeches buoy.

=== 18 February ===
List of shipwrecks: 18 February 1935
Ship	State	Description
Rio Tambo	United Kingdom	The cargo ship ran aground on Rocky Island, Maine, United States and was a total loss.

=== 20 February ===
List of shipwrecks: 20 February 1935
Ship	State	Description
Vila	Yugoslavia	The cargo ship collided with Rodi (Italy) at the mouth of the Piave, Jesolo, Province of Venice, Italy and sank with the loss of four crew. Rodi rescued survivors.

=== 21 February ===
List of shipwrecks: 21 February 1935
Ship	State	Description
Kasagisan Maru	Japan	The cargo ship collided with Kuretake Maru (Japan) off Wakamatsu Island and was beached. She was refloated on 27 February.
Taide	Italy	The cargo ship foundered in the Atlantic Ocean (46°20′N 7°00′W). All crew were rescued by Galea ( Spain).

=== 22 February ===
List of shipwrecks: 22 February 1935
Ship	State	Description
Catherine Radcliffe	United Kingdom	The cargo ship ran aground at Cape Hachiman, Japan near the Nojimazaki Lighthouse. The subsequently started to break up and was declared a total loss on 26 March.

=== 24 February ===
List of shipwrecks: 24 February 1935
Ship	State	Description
St George	Saint Lucia	Excursion launch from Choiseul Village overturned Sunday afternoon and sunk 3 miles (4.8 km) off Laborie Village. 41 people were lost at sea, 74 were rescued.

=== 25 February ===
List of shipwrecks: 25 February 1935
Ship	State	Description
Eileen	United Kingdom	The coaster was driven ashore at Bangor, County Down. She was refloated on 13 April.

=== 27 February ===
List of shipwrecks: 27 February 1935
Ship	State	Description
Blairgowrie	United Kingdom	The cargo ship foundered in the Atlantic Ocean (48°20′N 27°01′W) with the loss of all 26 crew.
Eldorado	United Kingdom	The tug was driven ashore at Aberdeen. All ten crew were rescued by breeches buoy.
Senkai Maru	Japan	The cargo ship ran aground at Rason, Korea. She was refloated on 3 March.
Wallace Rose	United Kingdom	The coaster broke free from her moorings at Torquay, Devon in a gale and sank.

=== 28 February ===
List of shipwrecks: 28 February 1935
Ship	State	Description
No. 8	United Kingdom	The hopper ship sank in the Bristol Channel off Dale, Pembrokeshire.

=== Unknown date ===
List of shipwrecks: Unknown February 1935
Ship	State	Description
Orfeo	Spain	The 131.2-foot (40.0 m), 285-ton steam trawler, a sold off Castle-class naval trawler, was wrecked sometime in February at an unknown location.

== March ==
=== 1 March ===
List of shipwrecks: 1 March 1935
Ship	State	Description
Brakoll	Norway	The cargo ship ran aground on the west coast of Iceland. All crew were rescued.
Five Brothers	United Kingdom	The Thames barge collided with Highlander (United Kingdom) in the River Thames and sank with the loss of all three crew.

=== 2 March ===
List of shipwrecks: 2 March 1935
Ship	State	Description
Pommern	Finland	The barque ran aground at Port Germein, South Australia.
Zubr	Poland	The tug capsized and sank at Gdynia.

=== 6 March ===
List of shipwrecks: 6 March 1935
Ship	State	Description
Bio-Bio	Chile	The cargo liner suffered a fire off Antofagasta, and was beached and hulked. The hulk, named Guardadora, was broken up in December 1940.

=== 15 March ===
List of shipwrecks: 15 March 1935
Ship	State	Description
Aghios Nicolaos	Greece	The auxiliary caïque struck a mine in Eleusis Bay and sank with the loss of all four crew.
Shinyei Maru No.3	Japan	The cargo ship ran aground at Yesashi, Hokkaidō. She was refloated on 2 May.

=== 20 March ===
List of shipwrecks: 20 March 1935
Ship	State	Description
Portland Maru	Japan	The cargo ship was beached at Cape Torrens, Kangaroo Island, South Australia. She was declared a total loss on 25 March.

=== 25 March ===
List of shipwrecks: 25 March 1935
Ship	State	Description
Attiki	Greece	The cargo ship sprang a leak and was beached on Lemnos.

=== Unknown date ===
List of shipwrecks: Unknown date 1935
Ship	State	Description
Ordu	Turkey	The cargo ship ran aground at Bender Eregli. She was refloated on 11 May.

== April ==
=== 1 April ===
List of shipwrecks: 1 April 1935
Ship	State	Description
Klem	Norway	The whaler sank in the Atlantic Ocean off South Georgia. All crew survived.
Splint	Norway	The whaler sank in the Atlantic Ocean off South Georgia. All crew survived.

=== 2 April ===
List of shipwrecks: 2 April 1935
Ship	State	Description
Yorkvalley	United Kingdom	The coaster struck a rock and sank off Saint Sampson, Guernsey, Channel Islands. All twelve crew survived. She was raised on 15 April.

=== 5 April ===
List of shipwrecks: 5 April 1935
Ship	State	Description
British King	United Kingdom	The Thames barge collided with Thames barge Savoy (United Kingdom) in the River Thames at Gravesend and sank.

=== 6 April ===
List of shipwrecks: 6 April 1935
Ship	State	Description
Ospray II	United Kingdom	The 129.9-foot (39.6 m), 295-ton steam trawler was sunk in a collision with Caldew (United Kingdom) in the Sound of Jura, 2 miles (3.2 km) off Bellochantuy Bay, Kintyre (55°33′N 5°52′E) in 20 fathoms of water. Crew rescued from lifeboat by "Caldew".

=== 7 April ===
List of shipwrecks: 7 April 1935
Ship	State	Description
King Philip	United States	After being refloated after sinking at her dock, the 169-gross register ton excursion boat was scuttled as a means of disposal in 230 feet (70 m) of water off the coast of Massachusetts in Outer Boston Harbor.

=== 9 April ===
List of shipwrecks: 9 April 1935
Ship	State	Description
Havmøy	Norway	The cargo ship foundered 30 nautical miles (56 km) off Jamaica with the loss of thirteen of her eighteen crew.

=== 10 April ===
List of shipwrecks: 10 April 1935
Ship	State	Description
Aquitania	United Kingdom	The ocean liner ran aground in the Solent. She was refloated the next day.

=== 11 April ===
List of shipwrecks: 11 April 1935
Ship	State	Description
Beta	Finland	The coaster came ashore at Ristna, Estonia. She was refloated on 25 May.
Don	Norway	The coaster ran aground at Cayo Mégano Chico, Cuba. She was refloated on 16 April.
Letitia	United Kingdom	The ocean liner ran aground at Cape Pappas, Patras, Greece. She was refloated two days later.
Martinet	United Kingdom	The ketch ran aground at Wells-next-the-Sea, Norfolk. She was refloated on 15 April.

=== 15 April ===
List of shipwrecks: 15 April 1935
Ship	State	Description
Hendrik	United Kingdom	The cargo ship ran aground at Tarifa, Andalusia, Spain. She was declared a total loss on 23 April.
Kwaiten Maru	Japan	The cargo ship sank in the East China Sea 4 nautical miles (7.4 km) south east of the Koshikijima Islands.

=== 24 April ===
List of shipwrecks: 24 April 1935
Ship	State	Description
HMAS Geranium	Royal Australian Navy	The stripped hulk of the decommissioned Arabis-class sloop-of-war was sunk as a target in the Tasman Sea off Sydney Heads, Australia.
HMAS Mallow	Royal Australian Navy	The decommissioned Lapwing-class minesweeper was sunk as a target off Australia.
Virginia IV	United States	The 92-gross register ton, 97.6-foot (29.7 m) motor cargo ship became stranded and was lost off Yakobi Island, Territory of Alaska, near the entrance to Lisianski Strait.

=== 25 April ===
List of shipwrecks: 25 April 1935
Ship	State	Description
San Martin	Argentina	The cargo ship ran aground in the Martín García Channel. She was refloated on 13 May.

=== 26 April ===
List of shipwrecks: 26 April 1935
Ship	State	Description
Windward	United Kingdom	The Thames barge capsized in the Thames Estuary off Southend, Essex. The crew survived.

=== 27 April ===
List of shipwrecks: 27 April 1935
Ship	State	Description
Agios Nicolaos	Greece	The cargo ship collided with Thraki (Greece) off Fleva Island and sank. All crew were rescued.

== May ==
=== 1 May ===
List of shipwrecks: 1 May 1935
Ship	State	Description
Jan	Norway	The cargo ship came ashore at Point Michaud, Nova Scotia, Canada.

=== 2 May ===
List of shipwrecks: 2 May 1935
Ship	State	Description
Berg No. 1	United States	With no one aboard, the 42-gross register ton, 50-foot (15.2 m) scow sank without loss of life off Cape Saint Elias on the south-central coast of the Territory of Alaska.

=== 6 May ===
List of shipwrecks: 6 May 1935
Ship	State	Description
Silvonia	United Kingdom	The cargo ship struck a rock and sank off Jersey, Channel Islands. The crew were rescued.

=== 7 May ===
List of shipwrecks: 7 May 1935
Ship	State	Description
Tagonoura Maru	Japan	The cargo ship came ashore on Kabaitō, Soviet Union. She was refloated on 13 May.

=== 8 May ===
List of shipwrecks: 8 May 1935
Ship	State	Description
Langleeridge	United Kingdom	The cargo ship ran aground on Bull Rock, Guion Island, Nova Scotia, Canada and was a total loss. All crew were rescued by CGS N. B. McLean (Canada).
Ville de Paris	France	The cargo ship ran aground at Fort Dauphin, Madagascar and subsequently foundered.

=== 9 May ===
List of shipwrecks: 9 May 1935
Ship	State	Description
Merenneito	Finland	The cargo liner collided with Tyr (Sweden) in the North Sea and sank. All on board were rescued.

=== 13 May ===
List of shipwrecks: 13 May 1935
Ship	State	Description
Hiravati	United Kingdom	The coaster struck a rock at Malwan, India and was beached. She was refloated on 22 May.

=== 15 May ===
List of shipwrecks: 15 May 1935
Ship	State	Description
Fraternity	United Kingdom	The cargo ship sank a Richelieu, Quebec, Canada.

=== 17 May ===
List of shipwrecks: 17 May 1935
Ship	State	Description
Daigen Maru No.3	Japan	The cargo ship came ashore on Sakhalin, Soviet Union. She was refloated on 21 May.

=== 19 May ===
List of shipwrecks: 19 May 1935
Ship	State	Description
Denali	United States	The cargo liner ran aground off the Zayas Islands, British Columbia, Canada. A fire subsequently developed, detonating her cargo of dynamite, and she was a total loss. All 42 people on board were rescued by the cutter USCGC Cyane ( United States Coast Guard).
Gumersindo Junquera	Spain	The cargo ship ran aground off Cape Villano and was a total loss. All crew survived.

=== 20 May ===
List of shipwrecks: 20 May 1935
Ship	State	Description
Marguerite	United Kingdom	The Thames barge was in collision with Hecht (Germany) in the River Thames at Greenwich. She was consequently beached in a severely damaged state.

=== 22 May ===
List of shipwrecks: 22 May 1935
Ship	State	Description
Diligencia	Spain	The schooner came ashore 6 nautical miles (11 km) south of Valencia and was wrecked.
Hawk	United States	The 5-ton motor vessel was lost at Chignik, Territory of Alaska, during a storm.

=== 30 May ===
List of shipwrecks: 30 May 1935
Ship	State	Description
Roland	Germany	The auxiliary three-masted schooner came ashore 5 nautical miles (9.3 km) south of Barra Seca, Brazil (19°14′S 39°36′W) and was wrecked. The crew survived.

== June ==
=== 5 June ===
List of shipwrecks: 5 June 1935
Ship	State	Description
Alt Heidelburg	United States	The 102-ton motor vessel was destroyed by fire off Vank Island (56°28′N 132°36′W) in Southeast Alaska 5 nautical miles (9.3 km; 5.8 mi) west of Wrangell, Territory of Alaska.
Suyehiro Maru	Japan	The cargo ship ran aground 30 nautical miles (56 km) south of Nagoya. She broke in tow on 18 June and was abandoned as a total loss.

=== 7 June ===
List of shipwrecks: 7 June 1935
Ship	State	Description
Iddesleigh	United Kingdom	The cargo ship ran aground on Black Rock, Alta Vela Island, Virgin Islands. She was refloated on 13 June.

=== 8 June ===
List of shipwrecks: 8 June 1935
Ship	State	Description
Castine	United States	The 71-foot (22 m), 69-gross register ton steam excursion boat struck the Inner Bay Ledges, a reef off Vinalhaven, Maine, and sank on the west side of the ledges at 44°04′42″N 068°57′31″W with the loss of two lives.

=== 10 June ===
List of shipwrecks: 10 June 1935
Ship	State	Description
Noyo	United States	The cargo ship ran aground at Point Arena, California. She was abandoned the next day.

=== 12 June ===
List of shipwrecks: 12 June 1935
Ship	State	Description
HMS Hastings	Royal Navy	The Hastings-class sloop ran aground on the Shabkutb Reef, Suakim, Sudan. She was still aground on 29 July.

=== 20 June ===
List of shipwrecks: 20 June 1935
Ship	State	Description
D. L. Harper	United States	The tanker ran aground at Lizard Head, Cornwall, United Kingdom. All 38 crew were rescued the next day by the Penzance Lifeboat.

=== 21 June ===
List of shipwrecks: 21 June 1935
Ship	State	Description
Blairbeg	United Kingdom	The cargo ship ran aground in the Firth of Clyde. She was refloated on 25 June.

=== 22 June ===
List of shipwrecks: 22 June 1935
Ship	State	Description
Alecos	Greece	The cargo ship foundered in the Atlantic Ocean off Cameriñas, Galicia, Spain.
City of Victoria	United Kingdom	The cargo ship ran aground at Cape Erimo, Hokkaidō, Japan and was a total loss.
Dana	Denmark	The research vessel collided with the trawler Pickhuben (Germany) in the North Sea 60 nautical miles (110 km) west of Jutland and sank. All 23 people on board were rescued by Pickhuben.
Edna No. 2	United States	The 28-gross register ton, 46.8-foot (14.3 m) fishing vessel was destroyed by fire at Ouzinkie, Territory of Alaska. All five people on board survived.
Grainton	United Kingdom	The cargo ship collided with Genua (Germany) in the English Channel 7 nautical miles (13 km) west of Beachy Head, Sussex. She was beached at Dover, Kent but was refloated the next day.

=== 23 June ===
List of shipwrecks: 23 June 1935
Ship	State	Description
Leonard B. Miller	United States	The cargo ship collided with Sumatra (United States) in the St. Clair River. Both vessels were beached.
St. Brandan	United Kingdom	The coaster struck a rock and foundered in the English Channel off Cherbourg, Charente-Maritime, France. All eleven people on board were rescued.

=== 25 June ===
List of shipwrecks: 25 June 1935
Ship	State	Description
Deane	United Kingdom	The whaler ran aground on the Penguin Islands, Newfoundland and was wrecked. All crew survived.
USS Marcus	United States Navy	The decommissioned Clemson-class destroyer was sunk as a gunnery target in the Pacific Ocean off San Diego, California.
Ming Hsien	China	The cargo ship sank in the Yangtze 25 nautical miles (46 km) upstream of Ichang.

=== 26 June ===
List of shipwrecks: 26 June 1935
Ship	State	Description
USS Sloat	United States Navy	The decommissioned Clemson-class destroyer was sunk as a target in the Pacific Ocean off San Diego, California.
Sunset Glow	United Kingdom	The auxiliary schooner ran aground at Battle Harbour, Labrador, Canada.

== July ==
=== 1 July ===
List of shipwrecks: 1 July 1935
Ship	State	Description
Forthbridge	United Kingdom	The cargo ship ran aground on Semirara Island, Philippines. She was refloated on 4 July.
South Wales	United Kingdom	The cargo ship ran aground in the Paraná River at Buenos Aires, Argentina. She was refloated on 9 July.

=== 2 July ===
List of shipwrecks: 2 July 1935
Ship	State	Description
Midori Maru	Japan	The passenger ship was rammed and sunk by Sensan Maru (Japan) in the Seto Inland Sea and sank with the loss of about 86 of the 232 people on board.

=== 3 July ===
List of shipwrecks: 3 July 1935
Ship	State	Description
Novice	France	The tug collided with York (United Kingdom) at Dunkerque, Nord and sank.

=== 4 July ===
List of shipwrecks: 4 July 1935
Ship	State	Description
Hopecrag	United Kingdom	The cargo ship collided with the sailing ship Kanlu (China) at Woosung, China and was beached. She was refloated on 6 July.

=== 6 July ===
List of shipwrecks: 6 July 1935
Ship	State	Description
Nivonia	United Kingdom	The whaler came ashore at Umzumbe, South Africa and was a total loss.
Reaveley	United Kingdom	The cargo ship ran aground in the Baltic Sea off Viatlin Point, Soviet Union. She was refloated on 9 July.

=== 7 July ===
List of shipwrecks: 7 July 1935
Ship	State	Description
Navigator	Finland	The cargo ship collided with Mervyn (United Kingdom) in the Atlantic Ocean 100 nautical miles (190 km) north west of Cape Villano, Spain (44°48′N 8°25′W). The crew abandoned ship and were rescued by Mervyn, which took Navigator in tow. The tow was later transferred to Ceylon (Sweden) but the ship subsequently foundered.
Tolosa	Norway	The cargo ship ran aground near the Glas Lighthouse, Scalpay, Outer Hebrides. She was refloated on 11 July.

=== 9 July ===
List of shipwrecks: 9 July 1935
Ship	State	Description
Attilio	Italy	The coaster foundered in the Mediterranean Sea off Benghazi, Libya with the loss of 21 of the 30 people on board.
Maheno	New Zealand	Maheno in 1935 Maheno in 2004. The retired ocean liner, being towed to Japan for scrapping, was caught in a cyclone, broke her towline and beached at Fraser Island, Queensland, Australia. She was a total loss. The wreck remains on the beach.

=== 12 July ===
List of shipwrecks: 12 July 1935
Ship	State	Description
Mowli	China	The cargo ship capsized and sank at Tinghai with the loss of six crew.

=== 14 July ===
List of shipwrecks: 14 July 1935
Ship	State	Description
Kannik	Norway	The cargo ship collided with Les Issers (France) off Dellys, Algeria and sank.
Navigator	Norway	The cargo ship sprang a leak and foundered in the Skaggerak 3 nautical miles (5.6 km) west north west of Hirtshals, Nordjylland, Denmark. All sixteen crew survived.

=== 15 July ===
List of shipwrecks: 15 July 1935
Ship	State	Description
Satsuma Maru	Japan	The cargo ship ran aground on the east coast of Sakhalin. She was refloated on 19 July.

=== 18 July ===
List of shipwrecks: 18 July 1935
Ship	State	Description
Bessie M	United States	After the 13-gross register ton, 36.9-foot (11.2 m) motor vessel caught fire while moored to a dock at Excursion Inlet, Territory of Alaska, with no one on board, she was towed away from the dock and scuttled to extinguish the fire by chopping a hole in her side. Her gasoline engine and lower hull were salvaged.

=== 19 July ===
List of shipwrecks: 19 July 1935
Ship	State	Description
Polar Bear	United States	During a voyage from Kodiak, Territory of Alaska, to Seattle, Washington, with a crew of 10 and a cargo of 55 tons of fish and trading goods on board, the 162-gross register ton, 83.6-foot (25.5 m) motor vessel was wrecked without loss of life in Kupreanof Strait between Kodiak Island and Afognak Island in the Kodiak Archipelago on a rock at the west end of Dry Spruce Island (57°57′20″N 153°02′30″W). The cutter USCGC Aurora ( United States Coast Guard) rescued her crew off the beach.

=== 22 July ===
List of shipwrecks: 22 July 1935
Ship	State	Description
Batavia Maru	Japan	The cargo liner ran aground on the Depond Reef, Thailand. Passengers were transferred to London Maru (Japan). She was abandoned by her crew on 31 July.
Sampo	Denmark	The schooner was abandoned in the Baltic Sea (57°40′N 19°14′E). The crew were rescued by Helene (Germany).
Sirvall	Sweden	The cargo ship ran aground on Öland. She was refloated on 1 August.

=== 23 July ===
List of shipwrecks: 23 July 1935
Ship	State	Description
Batavia Maru	Japan	The Indus Maru-class cargo ship (4,393 GRT, 1927) ran aground of Cambodia, French Indochina. Later salvaged and returned to service.

=== 25 July ===
List of shipwrecks: 25 July 1935
Ship	State	Description
B 3	Soviet Navy	The Bars-class submarine collided with Marat (Soviet Navy) in the Gulf of Finland and sank with the loss of all 55 crew. She was raised on 4 August and scrapped.

=== 28 July ===
List of shipwrecks: 28 July 1935
Ship	State	Description
Jewel Guard	United States	During a gale, the 12-gross register ton motor vessel was wrecked without loss of life on the beach at Spruce Creek (64°34′N 164°26′W) on the coast of the Territory of Alaska 8 miles (13 km) below Solomon.

=== 30 July ===
List of shipwrecks: 30 July 1935
Ship	State	Description
Burmistan	United Kingdom	The cargo liner struck a submerged object and sank at Kyaukpyu, Burma. All on board were rescued.
Errol	United Kingdom	The coaster collided with Cairnesk (United Kingdom) in the Firth of Forth and sank. All crew were rescued by Cairnesk. She was refloated on 20 August.

== August ==
=== 1 August ===
List of shipwrecks: 1 August 1935
Ship	State	Description
Foxie	United States	The 10-gross register ton, 33-foot (10.1 m) fishing vessel was destroyed by fire at Tenakee, Territory of Alaska. The two people on board survived.
HMAS Marguerite	Royal Australian Navy	The decommissioned Arabis-class sloop was sunk as a target.

=== 2 August ===
List of shipwrecks: 2 August 1935
Ship	State	Description
Libby, McNeill & Libby No. 2	United States	The 28-ton scow was anchored at Salamatof Beach in Cook Inlet on the south-central coast of the Territory of Alaska when a gale struck, causing her to drift onto the beach at East Foreland (60°43′N 151°24′W), where she became stranded and broke up in the surf.

=== 3 August ===
List of shipwrecks: 3 August 1935
Ship	State	Description
Dwarka	United Kingdom	The cargo ship ran aground at Chinde, Portuguese East Africa. She was refloated on 16 August.
Lakis Noumicos	Greece	The cargo ship ran aground on Naxos and was a total loss.

=== 4 August ===
List of shipwrecks: 4 August 1935
Ship	State	Description
Methilhill	United Kingdom	The cargo ship caught fire and was abandoned in the Atlantic Ocean (36°50′N 7°55′W). All 22 crew were rescued by Campeador (Spain). Methilhill was taken in tow by Shetland. She was taken to Lisbon, Portugal, where she was declared a constructive total loss.
Princess Ena	United Kingdom	The passenger ferry caught fire and sank in the English Channel 10 nautical miles (19 km) south of Jersey, Channel Islands. The crew were rescued by Duke of Normandy and St. Julien (both United Kingdom).

=== 6 August ===
List of shipwrecks: 6 August 1935
Ship	State	Description
Beryl	Norway	The cargo ship ran around at Almadi, French West Africa. She was abandoned the next day.

=== 8 August ===
List of shipwrecks: 8 August 1935
Ship	State	Description
Cragside	United Kingdom	The coaster was in collision with Madura (United Kingdom) in the River Thames at Woolwich and sank. All ten crew were rescued by Madura. The wreck was raised on 29 August.

=== 13 August ===
List of shipwrecks: 13 August 1935
Ship	State	Description
Clyro	United Kingdom	The 125.7-foot (38.3 m), 275-ton steam trawler was wrecked just before midnight on Powder House Rock, just south of Culzean Castle, in Culzean Bay (55°21′N 04°47′W). Declared a total loss, the wreck later broke in half.

=== 14 August ===
List of shipwrecks: 14 August 1935
Ship	State	Description
Helen Payne	United States	A gasoline explosion and fire destroyed the nine-ton fishing vessel in Salmon Bay (56°18′15″N 133°09′00″W) on the coast of Prince of Wales Island in the Alexander Archipelago in Southeast Alaska. Her crew of three survived.

=== 16 August ===
List of shipwrecks: 16 August 1935
Ship	State	Description
Letitia	United Kingdom	The ocean liner ran aground on the South Briggs Reef, at the entrance to Belfast Lough. She was refloated on 20 August.

=== 17 August ===
List of shipwrecks: 17 August 1935
Ship	State	Description
Creteforge	Spain	The 180-foot (55 m) concrete barge was sunk at Candás harbour in Asturias, Spain.
Joseph Medill	United Kingdom	The cargo ship, having departed from Newcastle-upon-Tyne, Northumberland, on 10 August on her maiden voyage, was last reported on this date at 57°19′N 26°12′W. Presumed foundered with the loss of all hands.

=== 18 August ===
List of shipwrecks: 18 August 1935
Ship	State	Description
Gareloch	United Kingdom	The 125.6-foot (38.3 m), 246-ton steam trawler stranded in dense fog at Billow Ness near the Anstruther bathing pool (56°12′N 02°42′W) and abandoned as a total loss. She was broken up in place.

=== 19 August ===
List of shipwrecks: 19 August 1935
Ship	State	Description
Gunnaren	Sweden	The cargo ship ran aground on Swona, Orkney Islands, United Kingdom. She was subsequently declared a total loss.

=== 21 August ===
List of shipwrecks: 21 August 1935
Ship	State	Description
Blue Bird	United States	The 7-net register ton motor vessel was destroyed by fire in Cholmondeley Sound (55°17′N 132°04′W) in Southeast Alaska. Her crew of four survived.
Konan Maru	Japan	The cargo ship caught fire at Chemulpo, Korea, and was burnt out.

=== 23 August ===
List of shipwrecks: 23 August 1935
Ship	State	Description
Penguin	Chile	The whaler ran aground on Santa María Island and was wrecked. All crew survived.
Port Jackson	United Kingdom	The 115.7-foot (35.3 m) trawler stranded on a reef off Scotstown Head, north of Peterhead. Five of crew taken off by Peterhead lifeboat "Duke of Connaught". She later took off the Skipper and 2 crew just before sinking. Declared a Constructive Total Loss.

=== 25 August ===
List of shipwrecks: 25 August 1902
Ship	State	Description
Viking	United States	Under tow by New Rustler (United States) from Wingham Island in Prince William Sound bound for Petersburg, Territory of Alaska, the 15-ton, 46.4-foot (14.1 m) fishing vessel was lost without loss of life when New Rustler was forced to cut her adrift in a gale in the North Pacific Ocean 35 nautical miles (65 km) off Icy Bay, Southeast Alaska.

=== 26 August ===
List of shipwrecks: 26 August 1935
Ship	State	Description
Lizzie E. B.	United Kingdom	The schooner ran aground on the Indian Islands, Fogo, Newfoundland and was a total loss.
Phyllis and H. West	United Kingdom	The schooner ran aground at Torbay, Newfoundland and was wrecked.

=== 27 August ===
List of shipwrecks: 27 August 1935
Ship	State	Description
Ikoma Maru	Japan	The coaster collided with Kyodo Maru No.28 at Kobe and sank.
Senator	United States	The 41-gross register ton, 58-foot (18 m) fishing vessel was destroyed in Nutkwa Inlet (54°59′30″N 132°35′45″W) in Cordova Bay in the Alexander Archipelago in Southeast Alaska by a fire that started in her engine room and caused her fuel tanks to explode. She sank, and the motor vessel Tom and Al (United States) rescued her entire crew of three.

=== 28 August ===
List of shipwrecks: 28 August 1935
Ship	State	Description
Svea	Finland	The three-masted schooner ran aground on the Falsterbo Reef and was severely damaged. She was refloated on 10 September.

=== 29 August ===
List of shipwrecks: 29 August 1935
Ship	State	Description
Aghios Vlassios	Greece	The cargo ship ran aground on Hatter Rev, Denmark. She was refloated on 4 September.

=== Unknown date ===
List of shipwrecks: Unknown date 1935
Ship	State	Description
Henry Gust	United States	Sonar image of the wreck of Henry Gust, June 12, 2022. The 65-foot (20 m), 37.5-gross register ton steam screw tug was towed into Lake Michigan and set afire as a means of disposal. She remained afloat, so a United States Coast Guard vessel from Two Rivers, Wisconsin, deliberately rammed her, sinking her in 80 to 85 feet (24 to 26 m) of water off Manitowoc County, Wisconsin, at 44°08.398′N 087°29.29′W. The wreck lies within the Wisconsin Shipwreck Coast National Marine Sanctuary.

== September ==
=== 2 September ===
List of shipwrecks: 2 September 1935
Ship	State	Description
Kirsten	Denmark	The cargo ship ran aground at Ristna, Estonia.
Maria I. M.	Greece	The cargo ship sank off Cape Maleas. All crew were rescued.
United States	Italy	The ocean liner was severely damaged by fire at Copenhagen, Denmark whilst undergoing conversion to a troopship.

=== 3 September ===
List of shipwrecks: 3 September 1935
Ship	State	Description
Aeolos	Greece	The cargo ship ran aground at Sudruk Point, Novorossisk, Soviet Union. She was refloated on 9 September.
Capulet	United Kingdom	The tanker ran aground off the Great Isaac Lighthouse, Bahamas.
Dixie	United States	The passenger ship ran aground on the Carysfort Reef, Florida. All 352 people on board were rescued. Dixie was refloated on 19 September.

=== 4 September ===
List of shipwrecks: 4 September 1935
Ship	State	Description
Anna J	United States	The 28-gross register ton halibut-fishing vessel was beached in Plumper Bay (48°26′40″N 123°25′55″W) on the coast of British Columbia in Canada and became a total loss after the steamer Prince Rupert (Canada) collided with her near Maud Island (49.2705°N 124.0814°W) in Seymour Narrows.

=== 5 September ===
List of shipwrecks: 5 September 1935
Ship	State	Description
Doric	United Kingdom	The ocean liner collided with Formigny (France) off Cape Finisterre, Spain. Passengers were transferred to Orion and Viceroy of India (both United Kingdom). Although temporarily repairs were carried out, she was subsequently declared a constructive total loss and scrapped in November 1935.
Fayal	Portugal	The cargo ship ran aground at Fogo, Newfoundland and was wrecked.

=== 7 September ===
List of shipwrecks: 7 September 1935
Ship	State	Description
Onassi Maria	Greece	The cargo ship ran aground on Capraia Isola, Livorno, Italy and was wrecked.

=== 17 September ===
List of shipwrecks: 17 September 1935
Ship	State	Description
Kalba	Netherlands	The coaster was abandoned in the North Sea off Westkapelle, Zeeland with the loss of one crew member. She came ashore at Domburg, Zeeland. She was refloated on 29 September.
Countess of Erne	United Kingdom	The coal hulk foundered at Portland Harbour, Dorset.
Goeland	France	The auxiliary schooner came ashore at Rhoose, Glamorgan in a gale. All seven crew were rescued by the Barry Lifeboat Prince David ( Royal National Lifeboat Institution). She was on a voyage from Roscoff, Finistèère to Swansea, Glamorgan.
HMS L52	Royal Navy	The L-class submarine, under tow to be scrapped, broke free from the tug towing her when off Lundy Island, Devon. She came ashore at Sully, Glamorgan.

=== 18 September ===
List of shipwrecks: 18 September 1935
Ship	State	Description
Bramow	Germany	The cargo ship ran aground off Borkum, Germany and was a total loss. All crew survived.

=== 19 September ===
List of shipwrecks: 19 September 1935
Ship	State	Description
Lilburn	United Kingdom	The cargo ship was beached at Stornoway, Isle of Lewis. She was refloated on 5 October.

=== 23 September ===
List of shipwrecks: 23 September 1935
Ship	State	Description
San Antonio	France	The cargo ship ran aground on the Salmedina Bank, Cartagena, Murcia, Spain. She was refloated on 3 October.

=== 24 September ===
List of shipwrecks: 24 September 1935
Ship	State	Description
Hurry On	United Kingdom	The cargo ship capsized and sank off Port Hood, Cape Breton, Nova Scotia, Canada with the loss of five of her twelve crew.

=== 25 September ===
List of shipwrecks: 25 September 1935
Ship	State	Description
Velos	Greece	The coaster sank off Cape Malea with the loss of three crew.

=== 26 September ===
List of shipwrecks: 26 September 1935
Ship	State	Description
Clan Malcolm	United Kingdom	The cargo ship ran aground at Lizard Point, Cornwall. She was abandoned as a total loss.

=== 27 September ===
List of shipwrecks: 27 September 1935
Ship	State	Description
Bramhall	United Kingdom	The cargo ship ran aground at Les Fourches, Quimper, Finistère, France. All crew were rescued. She subsequently broke in two and was a total loss.
Rotterdam	Netherlands	The ocean liner ran aground in the Morant Cays. All 450 passengers were transferred to Ariguani (United Kingdom). She was refloated on 6 October.
Viliandi	Estonia	The auxiliary schooner sprang a leak in the Baltic Sea off Gotland, Sweden. The crew were taken off by Gerania (Sweden).

=== 28 September ===
List of shipwrecks: 28 September 1935
Ship	State	Description
Two Fats	United States	The 8-gross register ton, 32.2-foot (9.8 m) motor vessel broke loose from her mooring at a dock in Seward, Territory of Alaska, during a gale and was wrecked on the beach without loss of life.

=== 29 September ===
List of shipwrecks: 29 September 1935
Ship	State	Description
Liahona	United States	The 40-net register ton motor vessel began flooding heavily after she struck ground in heavy fog in Chatham Strait off Baranof Island near Red Bluff Bay (56°50′30″N 134°42′00″W) in the northern Alexander Archipelago in Southeast Alaska, then sank before she could be beached. The cutter USCGC Cyane ( United States Coast Guard) assisted in rescuing her 10-man crew.
Megna	United Kingdom	The cargo ship was driven ashore at Cienfugos, Cuba. She was refloated on 10 October.
Swan	United Kingdom	The Thames barge sank in the North Sea off the Barrow Deep. Both crew were rescued by Bamburgh (United Kingdom).
Wanderer	United Kingdom	The cargo ship was driven ashore at Cienfugos. She was refloated on 7 October.

=== 30 September ===
List of shipwrecks: 30 September 1935
Ship	State	Description
Bratholm	Norway	The auxiliary sailing vessel sank off Marstrand, Sweden. All crew were rescued.

== October ==
=== 2 October ===
List of shipwrecks: 2 October 1935
Ship	State	Description
Clydebank	United Kingdom	The cargo ship ran aground at Lusaran Point, Guimaras Island, Philippines. She was refloated on 5 October.

=== 3 October ===
List of shipwrecks: 3 October 1935
Ship	State	Description
Sitka	United States	During a voyage from Ketchikan to Juneau, Territory of Alaska, with 11 crewmen and a cargo of 1,500 pounds (680 kg) of general merchandise aboard, the 74-ton, 73-foot (22 m) motor vessel ran aground on a rock off Narrow Point (55°47′30″N 132°28′30″W) in Clarence Strait in Southeast Alaska. The motor vessel St. Nichols (United States) assisted her in getting off the rock.

=== 8 October ===
List of shipwrecks: 8 October 1935
Ship	State	Description
Mairo	Norway	The coaster departed from Lerwick, Shetland Islands, United Kingdom bound for Königsberg, East Prussia, Germany. No further trace, presumed foundered in the North Sea with the loss of all hands.

=== 10 October ===
List of shipwrecks: 10 October 1935
Ship	State	Description
British Oak	United Kingdom	The Thames barge collided with the pier at Ramsgate Harbour and was consequently beached. The crew were rescued by the Ramsgate Lifeboat. She was refloated the next day.
Margit	Sweden	The auxiliary three-masted schooner came ashore near Smyge. The crew were rescued.
Sheaf Crown	United Kingdom	The cargo ship ran aground in the Paraná River upstream of Constitución, Buenos Aires. She was refloated on 17 October.

=== 15 October ===
List of shipwrecks: 15 October 1935
Ship	State	Description
Les Deux Frères	France	The schooner sank in the English Channel 84 nautical miles (156 km) north west of Ouessant, Finistère. Twenty-six of her 31 crew were rescued by Abeille No.24 (France).
Lindenfels	Germany	The cargo ship was driven ashore at Hoogly, India. She was refloated on 16 October.

=== 16 October ===
List of shipwrecks: 16 October 1935
Ship	State	Description
Fido	Norway	The Design 1020 cargo ship ran aground at Måløy, Norway. She was refloated but was subsequently beached. She was refloated on 18 October.

=== 17 October ===
List of shipwrecks: 17 October 1935
Ship	State	Description
Adrar	France	The cargo ship ran aground 4 nautical miles (7.4 km) north of Rotes Kliff, Sylt, Germany. She was refloated on 18 August 1936.
Ausonia	Italy	The ocean liner was gutted by fire at Alexandria, Egypt. Six crew were killed and seven were seriously injured. They were treated on board RFA Maine (Royal Navy). She was declared a total loss on 12 November.
Insterburg	Germany	The coaster departed from Rotterdam, Netherlands for Königsberg, East Prussia, Germany. A lifeboat washed up at Egmond aan Zee, North Holland on 22 October. Presumed foundered in the North Sea with the loss of all hands.
Lochgorm	United Kingdom	The ferry was driven ashore at Bowmore, Islay, Inner Hebrides. She was refloated on 10 November.
Noemijulia	United Kingdom	The cargo ship ran aground in the Danube at Brăila, Romania. She was refloated the next day.
Vardulia	United Kingdom	The cargo ship foundered in the Atlantic Ocean 700 nautical miles (1,300 km) west of Northern Ireland with the loss of all 37 crew.

=== 19 October ===
List of shipwrecks: 19 October 1935
Ship	State	Description
Carricklee	United Kingdom	The coaster sank in the North Sea 2 nautical miles (3.7 km) off the Sunk Lightship (United Kingdom).
Drente	Netherlands	The tug was driven ashore at Egmond aan Zee, North Holland. All crew were rescued by lifeboats.
Douglas	United Kingdom	The coaster was driven ashore at Knoydart, Inverness-shire. She was refloated on 30 October.
Esbo	Finland	The cargo ship was driven ashore at Bootle, Cumberland. All 24 crew survived, with fifteen of them being rescued by the Bootle and Whitehaven Lifeboats. The cited report is incorrect (refer Whitehaven News 24 October 1935, pages 5 and 7), not least as Whitehaven Lifeboat had closed in 1924 and there never was a Bootle Lifeboat. Maryport and Barrow lifeboats launched on service (Maryport was a 14-hour service), but the rescue was by the Whitehaven and Bootle Rocket Brigades using breeches buoy apparatus. A number of medals were awarded to Maryport lifeboat crew by the Finnish government.
Fair City	United Kingdom	The coaster was driven ashore at Stannergate, Dundee, Perthshire. She was refloated on 23 August.
Kerkplein	Netherlands	The cargo ship ran aground at Egmond aan Zee. She was refloated on 5 February 1936.
Magrix	United Kingdom	The coaster was driven ashore at Spurn Head, Yorkshire. The crew abandoned the ship the next day. She was refloated on 13 November.

=== 20 October ===
List of shipwrecks: 20 October 1935
Ship	State	Description
Adrar	Germany	The cargo ship was driven ashore on Sylt. She was refloated in August 1936. Subsequently repaired and returned to service.
Ardfern	United Kingdom	The coaster was driven ashore at Port Ellen, Islay, Inner Hebrides. She was refloated on 31 December.
Lough Fisher	United Kingdom	The coaster was driven ashore at Cardross, Argyllshire. She was refloated on 13 November.
Nuevo Panama	Panama	The coaster was driven ashore in Panama Bay and was abandoned as a total loss.
Pendennis	United Kingdom	The cargo ship foundered in the North Sea (54°05′N 5°32′E). All crew and the ship's cat were rescued by Iris (Norway).

=== 21 October ===
List of shipwrecks: 21 October 1935
Ship	State	Description
Bella	Sweden	The coaster was wrecked on Saaremaa, Estonia with the loss of all but two crew.
P.L.A. No.6	United Kingdom	The dredger foundered in the Bristol Channel off Pendeen, Cornwall.

=== 22 October ===
List of shipwrecks: 22 October 1935
Ship	State	Description
E. Nielson	United States	After her anchor line broke during a gale, the 18-gross register ton fishing vessel was blown ashore and wrecked without loss of life near Cora Point (55°54′50″N 134°06′55″W) on Coronation Island in the Alexander Archipelago in Southeast Alaska. The motor vessel Venus (United States) rescued her crew of two.
Ibis	United States	After becoming disabled in a gale, the 16-gross register ton motor vessel capsized and broke up in 102 feet (31 m) of water 0.5 nautical miles (0.9 km; 0.6 mi) east of Aats Point (55°55′45″N 134°16′00″W) in Southeast Alaska after the motor vessel Venus (United States), which was attempting to tow her to safety, was forced to cut the towline. Venus rescued the only person aboard Ibis.
Premier	United States	The 14-gross register ton, 37.8-foot (11.5 m) fishing vessel capsized and sank 0.75 nautical miles (1.39 km; 0.86 mi) from the mouth of Egg Harbor (55°55′30″N 134°19′15″W) off Coronation Island in the Alexander Archipelago in Southeast Alaska during a gale. The only person aboard died, and his body was never found.

=== 23 October ===
List of shipwrecks: 23 October 1935
Ship	State	Description
Alcyon	Netherlands	The coaster collided with Moreton Bay (United Kingdom) in the River Thames at Erith, Kent. One crew member was killed. She was beached in Erith Reach.
Berwindlea	United Kingdom	The cargo ship ran aground on Deadman's Island, Magdalen Islands, Nova Scotia, Canada in a storm. Survivors were rescued by England Maru (Japan) on 27 October. She was abandoned as a total loss on 5 November.

=== 25 October ===
List of shipwrecks: 25 October 1935
Ship	State	Description
America	United States	The 23-net register ton motor vessel exploded while fueling at Hoonah, Territory of Alaska. The only person on board survived, but she was a total loss.
Chapala	flag unknown	The tug capsized and sank whilst towing Lindenfels (Germany) with the loss of six crew.
Uskvalley	United Kingdom	The cargo ship came ashore at Onega, Soviet Union. She was declared a total loss on 31 October.

=== 27 October ===
List of shipwrecks: 27 October 1935
Ship	State	Description
Beaver	United States	The 18-net register ton fishing vessel flooded and sank suddenly 1.5 nautical miles (2.8 km; 1.7 mi) south of Point Crowley (56°07′10″N 134°15′30″W) in Southeast Alaska. Her crew of two survived.

=== 29 October ===
List of shipwrecks: 29 October 1935
Ship	State	Description
Cuzco	United States	The Design 1019 cargo ship ran aground on the Lempa Shoals, San Salvador, El Salvador. She was refloated on 5 November.
James Rockbreaker	United Kingdom	The dredger lost her tow off St. Ann's Head and was driven ashore at Freshwater West, Pembrokeshire. She was refloated on 15 December.
The Cable	United Kingdom	The cable layer struck an uncharted rock at Saigon, French Indo-China and sank. She was abandoned as a total loss on 14 November.

=== 30 October ===
List of shipwrecks: 30 October 1935
Ship	State	Description
Zabalbide	Spain	The cargo ship, carrying a cargo of esparto grass, caught fire at Garston, Lancashire. She was scuttled the next day to extinguish the fire. She was refloated on 18 November.

=== 31 October ===
List of shipwrecks: 31 October 1935
Ship	State	Description
Gazal	Turkey	The cargo ship was driven ashore at Zonguldak and was wrecked with the loss of one crew member.
Gerze	Turkey	The cargo liner was driven ashore at Karaburnu and sank. All passengers and crew were rescued.
Viator	Norway	Carrying a cargo of pickled herring, the motor cargo ship collided in heavy fog with the cargo ship Ormindale (United States) in Lake Huron off Thunder Bay Island off the coast of Michigan and sank in 188 feet (57 m) of water at 44.991333°N 83.03715°W.

=== Unknown date ===
List of shipwrecks: Unknown October 1935
Ship	State	Description
Malaga	United Kingdom	The 125.7-foot (38.3 m), 271-ton steam trawler, a sold off Castle-class naval trawler, was last seen on 17 October by the trawler San Sebastian (United Kingdom). Probably sunk in a storm on 18 October off Portrush, County Antrim, Northern Ireland. Lost with all 12 hands.

== November ==
=== 1 November ===
List of shipwrecks: 1 November 1935
Ship	State	Description
Sørvangen	Norway	The cargo ship ran aground at Morant Point, Jamaica. She was refloated on 9 November.

=== 2 November ===
List of shipwrecks: 2 November 1935
Ship	State	Description
Dina	Sweden	The schooner collided in the Baltic Sea off Visby, County with Sirius (Sweden) and sank. All crew were rescued by Sirius.
Elisabeth		The coaster came ashore at Johnstone's Point, Argyllshire. All crew were rescued. She was refloated on 28 November and beached at Campbelltown Loch.
Gerd	Sweden	The cargo ship collided with the barque Lingard (Finland) in the Kattegat and sank with the loss of all 21 crew. Lingard was deemed a constructive total loss.

=== 3 November ===
List of shipwrecks: 3 November 1935
Ship	State	Description
Penhir	France	The cargo ship sprang a leak in the English Channel and was beached at Brest, Finistère. She sank the next day.

=== 4 November ===
List of shipwrecks: 4 November 1935
Ship	State	Description
Shch-103	Soviet Navy	The Shchuka-class submarine ran aground off "Boyle Island" in Ussuri Bay. She was refloated on 28 March 1936 and taken in tow, but sank on 1 April. She was raised and beached, subsequently taken in to port on 14 April. Declared a total loss and scrapped.

=== 5 November ===
List of shipwrecks: 5 November 1935
Ship	State	Description
Ronald West	United Kingdom	The Thames barge was rammed and sunk at Harwich, Essex by Crossbill (United Kingdom). All three crew were rescued by Crossbill.

=== 7 November ===
List of shipwrecks: 7 November 1935
Ship	State	Description
Vierge Deliverance	Haiti	The sailing ship sank off Jérémie.

=== 9 November ===
List of shipwrecks: 9 November 1935
Ship	State	Description
Silverhazel	United Kingdom	The passenger ship ran aground on San Bernardino Island, Philippines and broke in two with the loss of four of the 54 people on board. Rescue attempts and survivors were rescued by Trabajador, USS Bulmer and USS Peary, Governor Taft (Philippine coasting vessel), Chicago Maru (damaged in the attempt) and other local craft.

=== 11 November ===
List of shipwrecks: 11 November 1935
Ship	State	Description
Inebolu	Turkey	The cargo liner foundered in the Gulf of Smyrnia with the loss of 70 of the 190 people on board. Survivors were rescued by Istikbal (Turkey), Polo (United Kingdom) or swam to shore.

=== 12 November ===
List of shipwrecks: 12 November 1935
Ship	State	Description
Hilary	United Kingdom	The ocean liner ran aground in the Amazon River 170 nautical miles (310 km) downstream of Manaus, Brazil. She had been refloated by 21 November.

=== 13 November ===
List of shipwrecks: 13 November 1935
Ship	State	Description
Cartes	Spain	The cargo ship foundered off Capo Busto, Spain with the loss of all hands.

=== 17 November ===
List of shipwrecks: 17 November 1935
Ship	State	Description
Brandaris	Germany	The auxiliary sailing ship collided with Talvaris (Latvia) in the Elbe at Blankenese, Hamburg, Germany and sank. The crew were rescued.

=== 18 November ===
List of shipwrecks: 18 November 1935
Ship	State	Description
Kingdoc	United Kingdom	The cargo ship ran aground at Morrisburg, Ontario. She was refloated on 21 November.

=== 19 November ===
List of shipwrecks: 19 November 1935
Ship	State	Description
Mura	Spain	The cargo ship ran aground at Cape San Antonio, Alicante. She was refloated on 30 November.

=== 20 November ===
List of shipwrecks: 20 November 1935
Ship	State	Description
Irland	Denmark	The cargo ship ran aground off Norrskär, Finland. She was refloated on 18 May 1936.
Krusaa	Denmark	The cargo ship came ashore in the Nantucket Sound. She was refloated on 26 November.
Sheaf Brook	United Kingdom	The cargo ship foundered in the North Sea 110 nautical miles (200 km) south east of the mouth of the Tyne with the loss of all nineteen crew.

=== 21 November ===
List of shipwrecks: 21 November 1935
Ship	State	Description
Ban Ho Guan	Netherlands	The cargo ship ran aground at Keelung, China and was wrecked.
General Gough	United Kingdom	The three-masted schooner departed Lisbon, Portugal bound for Grand Bank. No further trace, presumed foundered with the loss of all hands.

=== 22 November ===
List of shipwrecks: 22 November 1935
Ship	State	Description
Lancresse	United Kingdom	The cargo ship collided with Tres (Norway) in the English Channel off Ramsgate, Kent and sank with the loss of one of her eleven crew. The wreck was dispersed by explosives in February 1936.

=== 25 November ===
List of shipwrecks: 25 November 1935
Ship	State	Description
Daisy Marguerite	United Kingdom	The schooner foundered in Fortune Bay.
Orchis	United Kingdom	The coaster foundered in the Bristol Channel 5 nautical miles (9.3 km) off Pencarrow Head, Cornwall. The crew were rescued by a fishing vessel.

=== 26 November ===
List of shipwrecks: 26 November 1935
Ship	State	Description
Ithona	United States	During a voyage from Ketchikan, Territory of Alaska, to Prince Rupert, British Columbia, Canada, the 29-gross register ton fishing vessel was wrecked in thick fog on Hogg Rock (55°11′15″N 131°18′30″W) in Southeast Alaska. Her crew of six survived.

=== 30 November ===
List of shipwrecks: 30 November 1935
Ship	State	Description
Bagdad	France	The cargo liner ran aground off Sainte-Marie, Réunion. She was a constructive total loss.

=== Unknown date ===
List of shipwrecks: Unknown date 1935
Ship	State	Description
Elizabeth	United States	The freighter was driven ashore off Miami Beach in a hurricane in November. The vessel was refloated in May 1936 and scuttled.
Teru Maru	Japan	The cargo ship foundered in the South China Sea off Korea sometime between 1 and 12 November.

== December ==
=== 1 December ===
List of shipwrecks: 1 December 1935
Ship	State	Description
Jane Maersk	Denmark	The tanker ran aground at Refsnæs. She was refloated on 4 December.
Ypres	Spain	The cargo ship sank off Mete. The crew survived.

=== 2 December ===
List of shipwrecks: 2 December 1935
Ship	State	Description
Perynas II	Brazil	The cargo ship ran aground at Rio Grande do Sul and was wrecked.

=== 3 December ===
List of shipwrecks: 3 December 1935
Ship	State	Description
Crosby	United States	The steamship was destroyed by fire whilst laid up at Sturgeon Bay, Wisconsin.
Petoskey	United States	The steamship was destroyed by fire whilst laid up at Sturgeon Bay.
Swift	United States	The steamship was destroyed by fire whilst laid up at Sturgeon Bay.
Waukegan	United States	The steamship was destroyed by fire whilst laid up at Sturgeon Bay.

=== 4 December ===
List of shipwrecks: 4 December 1935
Ship	State	Description
Eddystone	United Kingdom	The Thames barge was rammed and sunk in the River Thames by City of Brussels (United Kingdom). The three crew were rescued by a tug.
Menja	Sweden	The cargo ship ran aground in the Nieuwe Diep. The crew were rescued.

=== 5 December ===
List of shipwrecks: 5 December 1935
Ship	State	Description
Branksea	United Kingdom	The coaster sprang a leak and sank at Dundee, Perthshire. She was refloated on 7 December.
Serb	United Kingdom	The cargo ship ran aground at Ballycastle, County Antrim. She was refloated on 9 December.

=== 6 December ===
List of shipwrecks: 6 December 1935
Ship	State	Description
Borgfred	Norway	The cargo ship ran aground on a reef 6 nautical miles (11 km) north east of Christiansted, United States Virgin Islands. She was refloated on 10 December.
Svanen	Sweden	The auxiliary schooner collided with Themis (Sweden) in the Baltic Sea off Vaxholm, Stockholm County and sank with some loss of life.

=== 9 December ===
List of shipwrecks: 9 December 1935
Ship	State	Description
Luisa Neri	United States	The tug collided with Exeter (United States) at New York Harbor and sank with the loss of one crew member.

=== 10 December ===
List of shipwrecks: 10 December 1935
Ship	State	Description
Avance	France	The tug was rammed and sunk by Oilreliance (United Kingdom) at Sète, Hérault.

=== 18 December ===
List of shipwrecks: 18 December 1935
Ship	State	Description
Minnie	United States	The 11-net register ton fishing vessel was abandoned after a fire broke out in her engine room and went out of control while she was in Clover Pass (55.4722°N 131.7917°W) in Southeast Alaska. Her crew of two abandoned ship in a skiff. Minnie burned for several hours and drifted onto the shore of Clover Island (55°29′N 131°48′W), becoming a total loss.

=== 19 December ===
List of shipwrecks: 19 December 1935
Ship	State	Description
E. C. Adams	United Kingdom	The schooner sank 250 nautical miles (460 km) south of Lunenburg, Nova Scotia.
Grosvenor	United Kingdom	The coaster ran aground on Lindisfarne, Northumberland and was wrecked. The eight crew were rescued by the Lindisfarne Lifeboat.
Sangstad	Norway	The cargo ship ran aground in the Hudson River 12 nautical miles (22 km) downstream of Albany, New York, United States. She was refloated on 22 December.

=== 20 December ===
List of shipwrecks: 20 December 1935
Ship	State	Description
Britt-Marie	Sweden	The cargo ship sank at Santos, São Paulo, Brazil when her cargo of nitrates caught fire and exploded. Three crew were killed.
Ionion	Greece	The cargo ship ran aground at Cakal Burnu, Turkey. She was refloated on 27 December.

=== 21 December ===
List of shipwrecks: 21 December 1935
Ship	State	Description
Otto Alfred Muller	Germany	The cargo ship was rammed and sunk in the Baltic Sea off Gdynia, Poland by Kersten Miles (Germany) and sank. She was refloated on 3 January.
Spind	Norway	The cargo ship ran aground at Nuevitas, Cuba. She was refloated on 28 December.

=== 23 December ===
List of shipwrecks: 23 December 1935
Ship	State	Description
Daressalaam	Germany	The tug foundered off Beira, Portuguese East Africa. All 23 crew were rescued by Incomati (United Kingdom).

=== 24 December ===
List of shipwrecks: 24 December 1935
Ship	State	Description
Michalis Poutos	Greece	The cargo ship ran aground at Gore Point, Somerset, United Kingdom. She broke her back and was a total loss. The wreck was refloated the next day. All 29 crew survived.
Stour	United Kingdom	The Thames barge ran aground off Brightlingsea, Essex and sank. All three crew were rescued by the Thames barge Genesta (United Kingdom). She was a total loss.

=== 25 December ===
List of shipwrecks: 25 December 1935
Ship	State	Description
Loustic	France	The schooner was blown ashore at Gyllyngvase Beach, Falmouth, Cornwall, United Kingdom. Although badly damaged it was later possible to refloat the ship. Or, she broke up a few days later.

=== 26 December ===
List of shipwrecks: 26 December 1935
Ship	State	Description
Kentbrook	United Kingdom	The coaster departed Plymouth, Devon for Portsmouth, Hampshire. No further trace, presumed foundered in the English Channel with the loss of all seven crew.
Paringa	China	The cargo ship foundered in the Pacific Ocean off Lakes Entrance, Victoria, Australia with the loss of all 31 crew.

=== 28 December ===
List of shipwrecks: 28 December 1935
Ship	State	Description
Ekatontarchos Dracoulis	Greece	The cargo ship collided with the dock at Keelung, China and was beached outside the harbour.
Kinburn	United Kingdom	The cargo ship was wrecked at Chéticamp, Nova Scotia, Canada.
Lough Fisher	United Kingdom	The cargo ship ran aground in the Irish Sea 3 nautical miles (5.6 km) north west of Barrow-in-Furness, Lancashire and sank. All nine crew survived.

=== 29 December ===
List of shipwrecks: 29 December 1935
Ship	State	Description
Cressado	United Kingdom	The cargo ship broke free from her moorings and was beached in the Douro at Porto, Portugal. The crew were taken off by breeches buoy.
Maud Llewellyn	United Kingdom	The cargo ship broke free from her moorings and was beached in the Douro at Porto. The crew were taken off by breeches buoy.

=== 30 December ===
List of shipwrecks: 30 December 1935
Ship	State	Description
Donetz	Soviet Union	The cargo ship is believed to have foundered off Helsingfors, Finland.

== Unknown date ==
List of shipwrecks: Unknown date 1935
Ship	State	Description
Chikuma	Imperial Japanese Navy	The decommissioned Chikuma-class protected cruiser was sunk as a target.
City of Taunton	United States	The 292-foot (89 m) cargo ship, a sidewheel paddle steamer, was beached and abandoned at Somerset, Massachusetts, on the west bank of the Taunton River at 41°42′39″N 071°10′33″W, just south of the future site of the Charles M. Braga Jr. Memorial Bridge, sometime during the 1930s. The wreck settled on the river bottom in very shallow water.
F. C. Pendleton	United States	The 145-foot (44 m), 408-gross register ton three-masted schooner burned and sank without loss of life in up to 45 feet (14 m) of water at 44°19′38″N 068°54′27″W while at anchor in Seal Harbor at Islesboro, Maine, sometime during the 1930s.
Gardner G. Deering	United States	The 251-foot (77 m), 1,982-gross register ton five-masted schooner was abandoned and later burned in Smith Cove off West Brooksville, Maine, sometime during the 1930s. Her wreck settled in 10 to 30 feet (3.0 to 9.1 m) of water approximately 500 feet (150 m) off the north shore of the cove at 44°22′55″N 068°46′30″W.
Moliette	United Kingdom	The 125.5-foot (38.3 m) floating night club, a former concrete-hulled merchant ship suffered a broken back and sank sometime after 30 September around West Mersea. Patched up enough to be refloated in 1939.
Salvator	United States	The 467-gross register ton, 160-foot (49 m) four-masted schooner was wrecked in Seldovia Bay (59°27′45″N 151°43′30″W) on the coast of the Territory of Alaska.
Van	United States	The retired 190-foot (58 m), 710-gross register ton coastal cargo ship was scuttled as a means of disposal in 300 feet (91 m) of water in the Atlantic Ocean 10 nautical miles (19 km; 12 mi) east of Nahant, Massachusetts.
