= HMAS Geranium =

1915 British ship

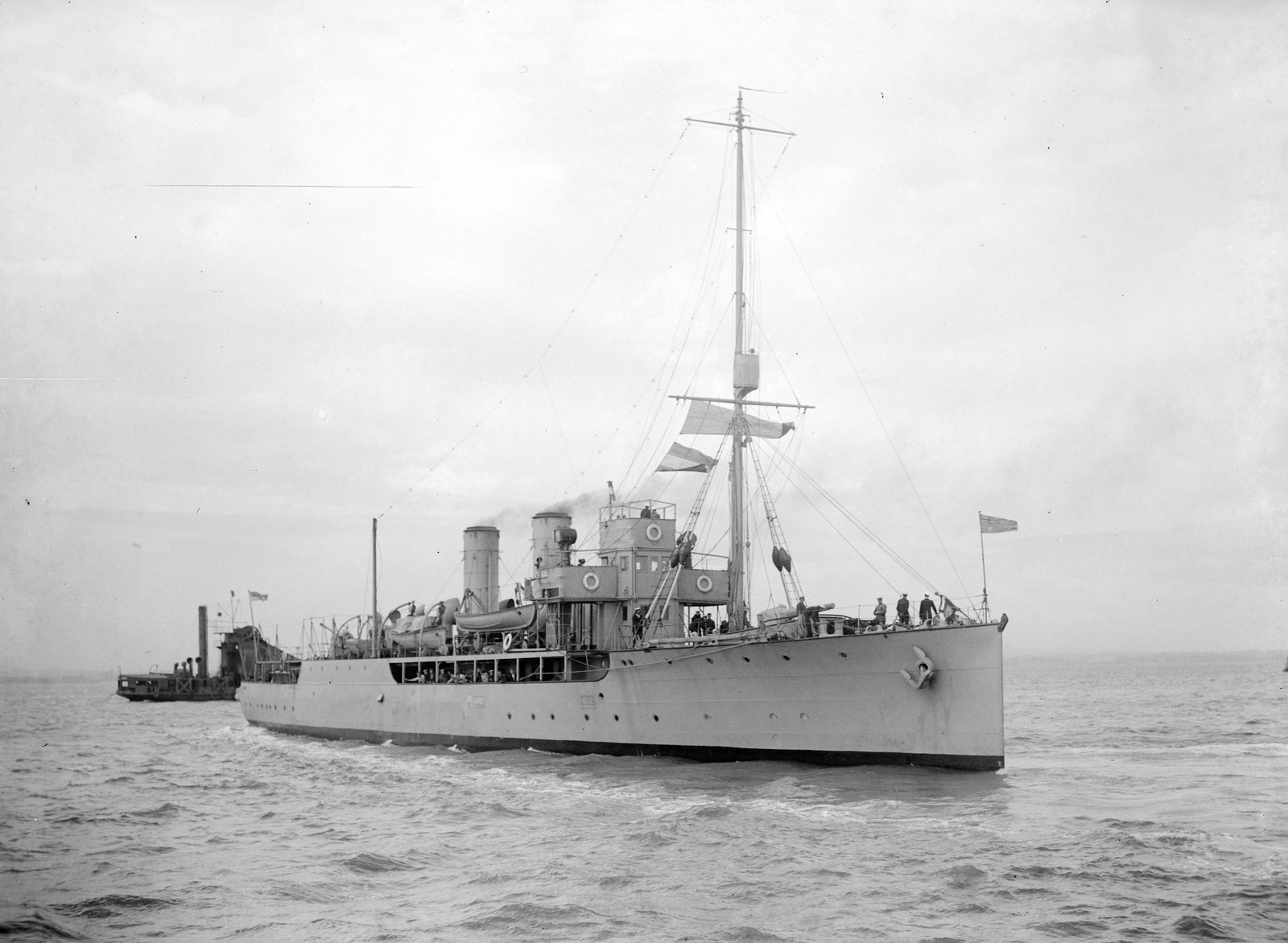
- HMAS Geranium

History

United Kingdom
- Name: Geranium
- Builder: Greenock & Grangemouth Dockyard Company
- Laid down: August 1915
- Launched: 8 November 1915
- Fate: Transferred to Australia, 1919

Australia
- Name: Geranium
- Acquired: 18 October 1919
- Commissioned: 17 January 1920
- Decommissioned: 10 November 1927
- Nickname(s): Gerger
- Fate: Dismantled, June 1932; Sunk as a hulk, 24 April 1935

General characteristics
- Class & type: Arabis-class sloop
- Displacement: 1,250 tons
- Length: 267 ft 9 in (81.61 m) o/a
- Beam: 33 ft 6 in (10.21 m)
- Draught: 11 ft 9 in (3.58 m)
- Propulsion: 1 × 4-cylinder triple expansion engine; 1 screw
- Speed: 16.5 knots (30.6 km/h; 19.0 mph)
- Range: 2,000 nautical miles (3,700 km; 2,300 mi) at 15 kn (28 km/h; 17 mph) with max. 250 tons of coal
- Complement: 77 (RN); 113 (RAN)
- Armament: 2 × 1 - QF 4 inch Mk IV guns, BL 4 inch Mk IX guns or QF 4.7 inch Mk IV guns and 2 × 1 - 3-pounders (47 mm) AA.
- Aircraft carried: 1 × Fairey IIID seaplane (RAN)

HMAS Geranium (formerly HMS Geranium) was an Arabis-class sloop built in Scotland and launched in 1915. The ship was operated by the Royal Navy as a minesweeper from 1915 until 1919, when she was transferred to the Royal Australian Navy (RAN) for use as a survey ship between 1919 and 1927. The ship was decommissioned in 1927 and scrapped during 1932, with the remains scuttled in 1935.

== Design and construction ==
Geranium was one of 56 Arabis-class sloops built for the Royal Navy during World War I. The sloops-of-war were intended for minesweeping duties in European waters.

Geranium had a displacement of 1,250 tons. She was 267 feet 9 inches (81.61 m) in length overall, had a beam of 33 feet 6 inches (10.21 m), and a maximum draught of 11 feet 9 inches (3.58 m). The propulsion system consisted of a four-cylinder triple expansion engine, connected to a single propeller shaft. Maximum speed was 16.5 knots (30.6 km/h; 19.0 mph), and the ship could achieve a range of 2,000 nautical miles (3,700 km; 2,300 mi) at 15 knots (28 km/h; 17 mph). Up to 250 tons of coal could be carried.

Geranium was laid down for the Royal Navy by the Greenock & Grangemouth Dockyard Company, Greenock, Scotland, in August 1915 and launched on 8 November 1915. She was delivered to the Royal Navy on 18 March 1916.

== Operational history ==
Geranium joined the Mediterranean Fleet after commissioning, being based at Malta.

After World War I, Geranium and two sister ships (Mallow and Marguerite) were sent to Australia to clear mines deployed by the German auxiliary cruiser SMS Wolf. Despite hard work in rough seas, the ships only found one mine.

Geranium and the other two ships were transferred to the Royal Australian Navy on 18 October 1919. The ships' minesweeper design made them suitable for handling survey equipment, and Geranium entered RAN service as the navy's first survey ship. The ship was poorly designed for survey duties in tropical Australian waters: she was designed for the North Sea climate, and was required to carry a ship's company of 113, 36 more than the intended ship's company of 77. In 1923, the sloop ran aground on an uncharted reef off Vanderlin Island in the Gulf of Carpentaria. The ship's company were able to refloat the ship and patch the damage, and after repairs in Sydney, the ship resumed northern survey operations. In October, Geranium rescued the civilian steamship Montoro after she struck Young Reef.

In early 1924, the ship ran aground again in the MacArthur River. The ship was refloated and repaired. Later that year, Geranium was fitted to carry a Fairey IIID seaplane: the first RAN survey vessel to carry an aircraft. In May 1927, the survey ship assisted the steamship Tasman, which had hit a reef off Clarke Island.

== Decommissioning and fate ==
Geranium paid off in 1927. The ship was broken up for scrap at Cockatoo Island Dockyard during 1932, and the stripped hulk was sunk as a target in the Tasman Sea outside Sydney Heads on 24 April 1935.
