= St John's Church, Port Ellen =

St John’s Church, Port Ellen
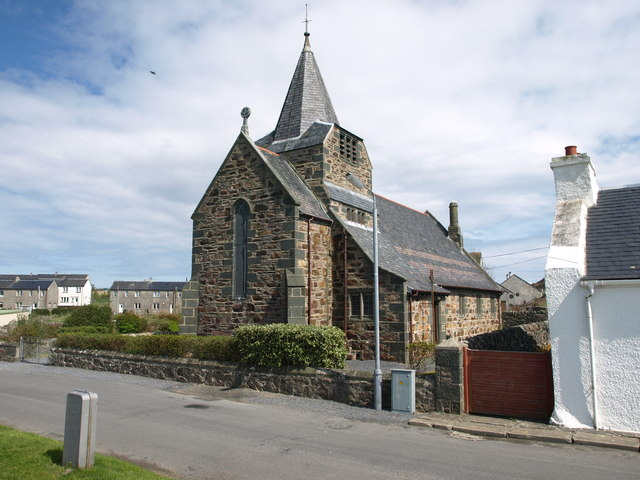
- St John’s Church, Port Ellen
- St John’s Church, Port Ellen
- 55°37′39.5″N 6°10′59″W
- Address: Frederick Street, Port Ellen, Islay
- Country: Scotland
- Denomination: Church of Scotland
- Website: www.islayjurachurches.co.uk/st-johns-church

Architecture
- Designated

Listed Building – Category B
- Designated: 24 April 2003
- Reference no.: LB49190
- Architect: Arthur George Sydney Mitchell
- Architectural type: Arts and Crafts
- Groundbreaking: 1897
- Completed: 1898

Administration
- Parish: Kidalton and Oa

St John's Church, Port Ellen is a Category B listed building in Port Ellen, Islay, Argyll and Bute, Scotland.

== History ==
The memorial stone for the new church was laid by Mrs Ramsay of Kidalton on 1 October 1897. It was built to replace the former churches at Lagavulin as the congregation in Port Ellen had grown. It is a single storey church in the Arts and Crafts style built on a rectangular plan. It was built to the designs of the architect Arthur George Sydney Mitchell.

There are three stained glass windows:

- A memorial to Revd. James Mackinnon, minister from 1894 to 1938 depicting Christ the Good Shepherd
- A memorial to Iain Ramsay of Kidalton, killed on 30 April 1942
- A window depicting a haymaking scene.

== Organ ==
An organ was gifted in 1945 in memory of Pilot Officer Alastair MacTaggart and five others of the parish who were killed on active service during the Second World War. The organ is no longer there as the present organ is an Allen Protege which was installed in August 2001.
