= SS Djemnah =

Coordinates: 33.2000°N 23.9167°E

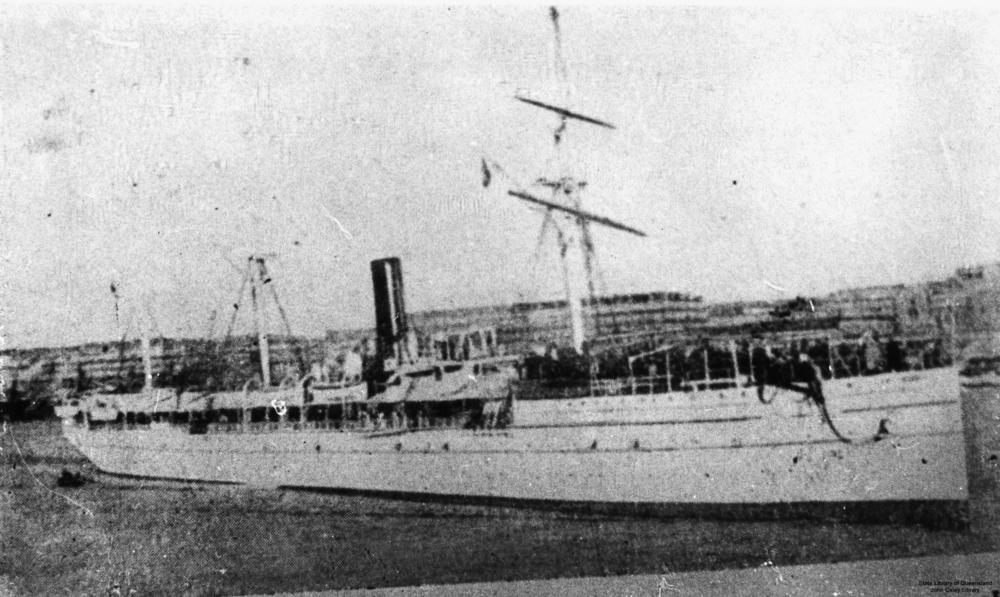

History

France
- Name: Djemnah
- Owner: Messageries Maritimes
- Builder: Messageries Maritimes, La Ciotat
- Launched: September 1874
- Fate: Sunk on 14 July 1918

General characteristics
- Type: Passenger steamer
- Tonnage: 3,716 GRT
- Length: 125 m (410 ft 1 in)
- Beam: 12.1 m (39 ft 8 in)
- Speed: 14 knots (26 km/h; 16 mph)
- Capacity: 1,385 passengers

SS Djemnah was a French cargo-passenger ship, launched in 1875, that was sunk in the Mediterranean by the German submarine UB-105 during the First World War.

== Description ==
Displacing 5,400 tonnes, the ship was 125 metres long, with a beam of 12.1 metres. Her top speed was 14 knots. The ship could carry 1385 passengers (83 in First Class, 42 in Second, 60 in Third and 1,200 below decks).

== History ==
The Djemnah was built in La Ciotat in 1875 for the shipping company Messageries Maritimes. The ship was used as a line ship to the Far East and to the Southern Indian Ocean.

On 4 November 1878, Djemnah was driven ashore at La Joliette, Bouches-du-Rhône. She was on a voyage from Marseille to China. Her 141 passengers were taken off. She was later refloated and put back to Marseille.

Filipino polymath and patriot Jose Rizal sailed aboard Djemnah during his trip to Europe to pursue medicine and continue the propaganda movement there with fellow Ilustrados in Spain.

On 6 July 1918, the ship left from Marseille for Madagascar, with a crew of 153, 601 passengers and 530 tons of cargo. On 14 July the ship was 69 nautical miles north from the Libyan coast when she was torpedoed at 21.32 by the German submarine UB-105 under command of Wilhelm Marschall. The ship sank in two minutes, taking with her 436 people, including the captain. 110 survivors were picked up by the trawler Presidency and 218 by the British escort HMS Mallow.
