= Port Ellen =

Coordinates: 55.63°N 6.18°W

Port Ellen: Scottish Gaelic: Port Ilein
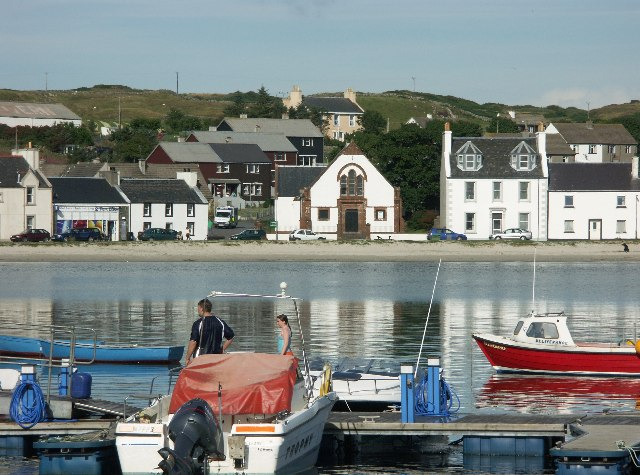
- Port Ellen

- Location within Argyll and Bute
- Population: 810 (2020)
- OS grid reference: NR365455
- Council area: Argyll and Bute
- Lieutenancy area: Argyll and Bute
- Country: Scotland
- Sovereign state: United Kingdom
- Post town: ISLE OF ISLAY
- Postcode district: PA42
- Dialling code: 01496
- Police: Scotland
- Fire: Scottish
- Ambulance: Scottish
- UK Parliament: Argyll, Bute and South Lochaber
- Scottish Parliament: Argyll and Bute

Port Ellen (Scottish Gaelic: Port Ilein) is a small town on the island of Islay, in Argyll, Scotland. The town is named after the wife of its founder, Walter Frederick Campbell. Its previous name, Leòdamas, is derived from Old Norse meaning "Leòd's Harbour".

Port Ellen is built around Loch Leòdamais, Islay's main deep water harbour. It is the largest town on Islay, only slightly larger than Bowmore and provides the main ferry connection between Islay and the mainland, at Kennacraig. The Port Ellen Distillery was first established in the 1820s and ceased production of Scotch whisky in 1983, until reopening in 2024. The large malting continues to produce for the majority of the distilleries on Islay.

== History ==
The area around Port Ellen has a variety of archaeological sites covering the Neolithic, Bronze and Iron Age periods. There are standing stones at Kilbride, a fort at Borraichill Mor, several chambered cairns, and a chapel at Cill Tobar Lasrach. Nearby lie the ruined remains of the 14th-century Dunyvaig Castle, once a fortress of the MacDonald Lords of the Isles.

The current town was planned by Walter Frederick Campbell and founded in 1821 originally intended to support the herring industry. It was originally called Port Ellinor in honour of his wife, Lady Eleanor Charteris (d. 1832), daughter of Francis Douglas, 8th Earl of Wemyss.

== Fishing ==
The Annual Reports of the Fishery Board for Scotland provide an insight into the state of fishing from Port Ellen in the years before the First World War. In the report for 1900 we learn that that the Mull of Oa was their principal fishing ground. They caught saithe and also used lobster creels.

Fishery Statistics

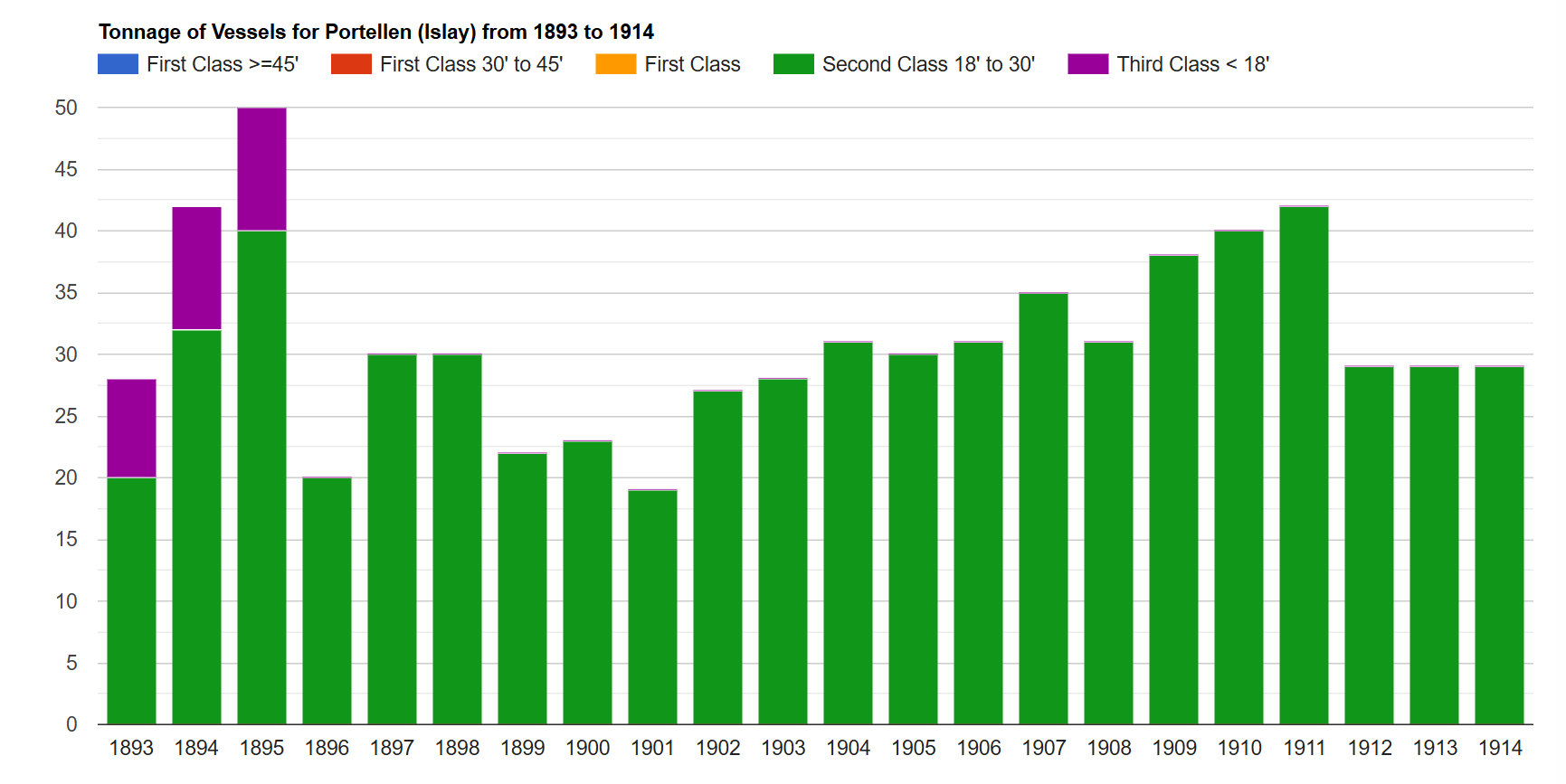
Tonnage of vessels

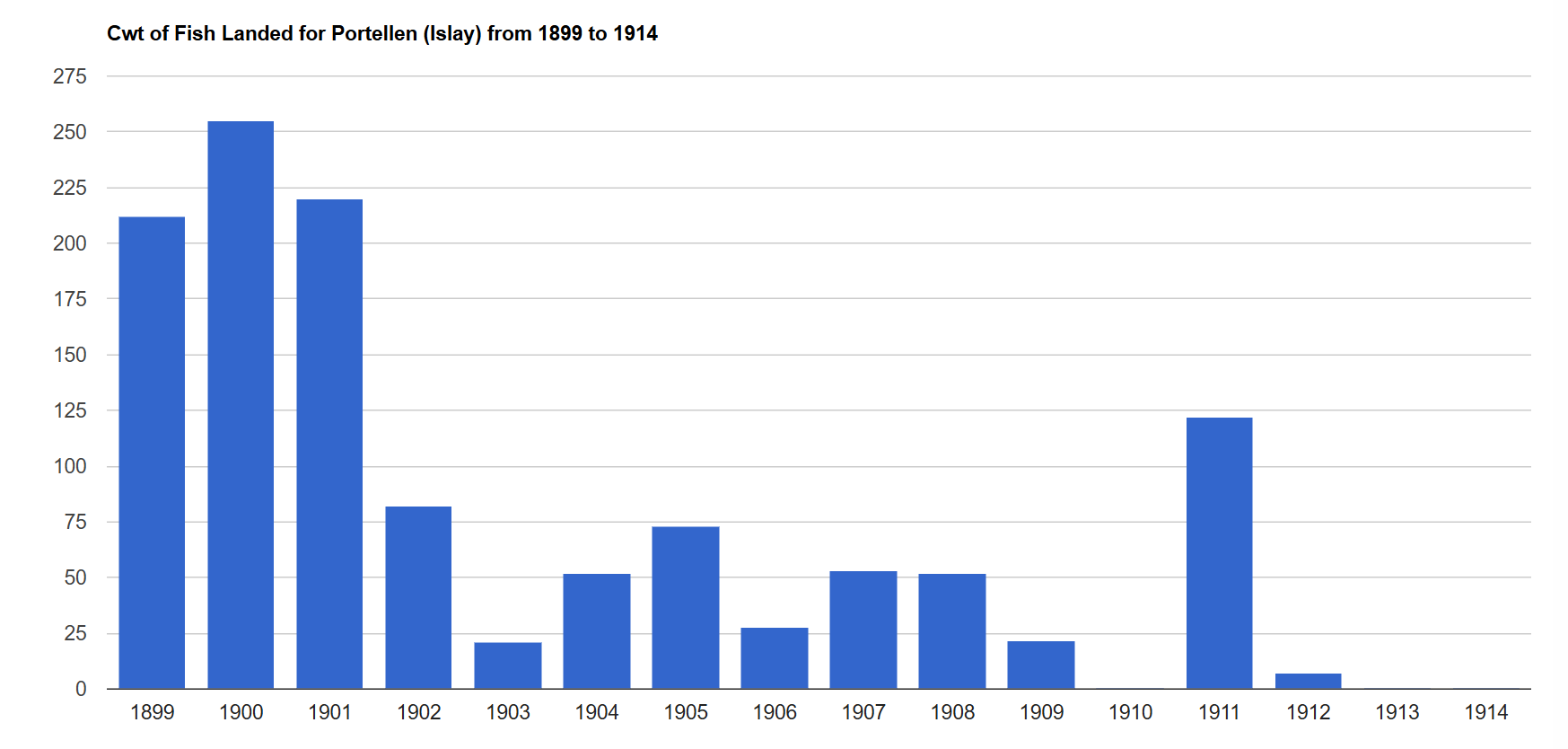
Cwt of fish landed

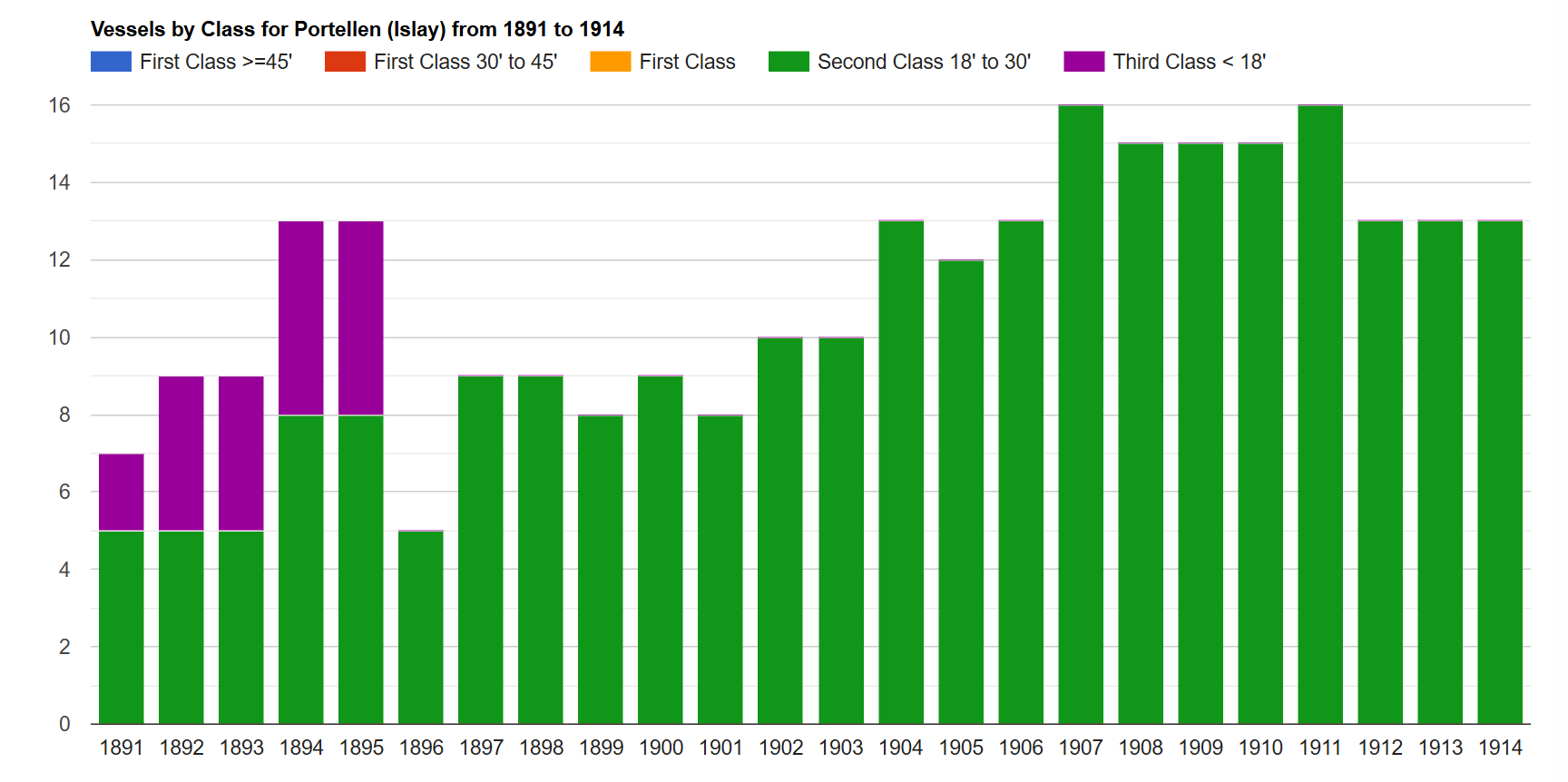
Vessels by class

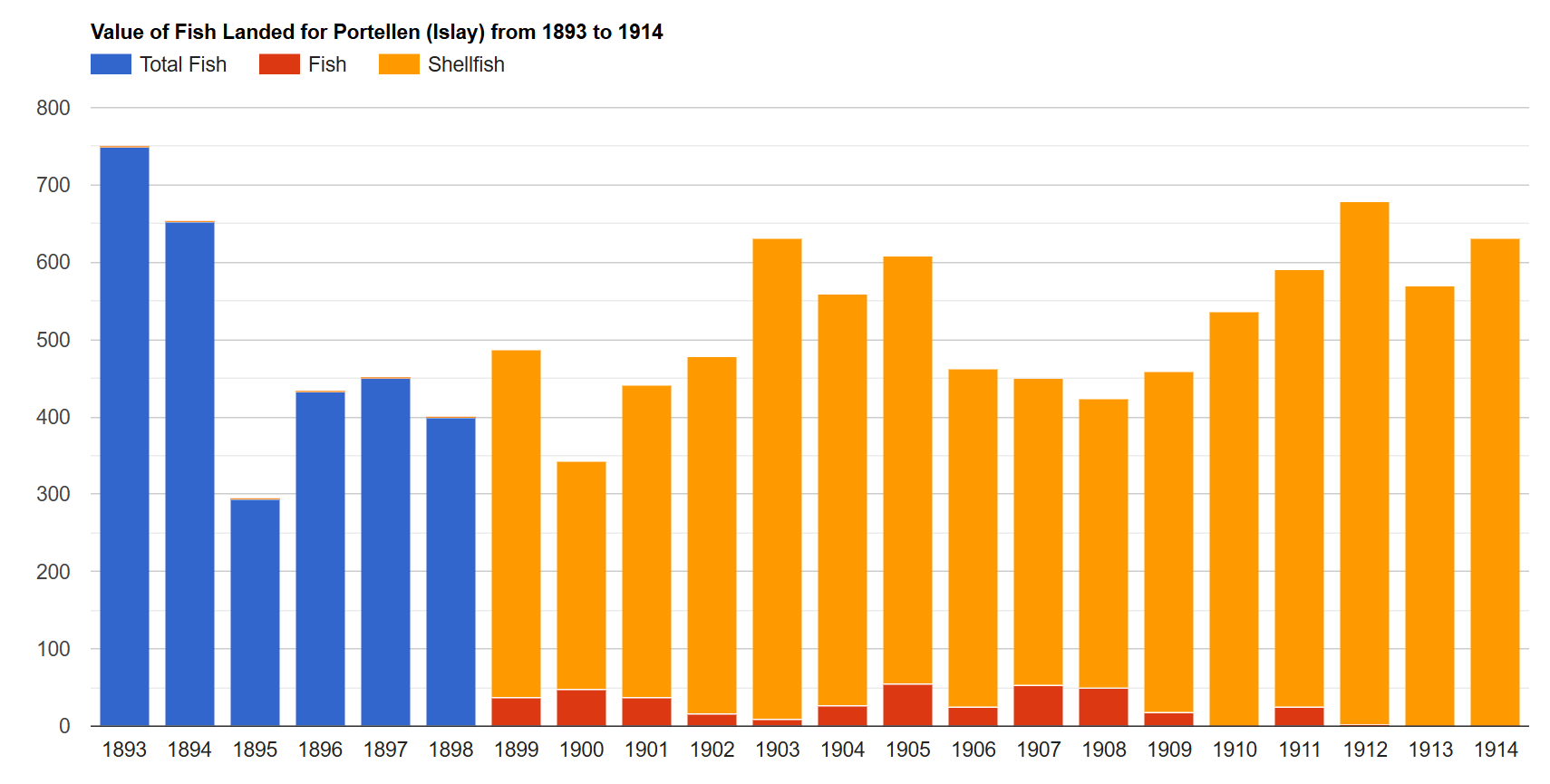
Value (£) of fish landed

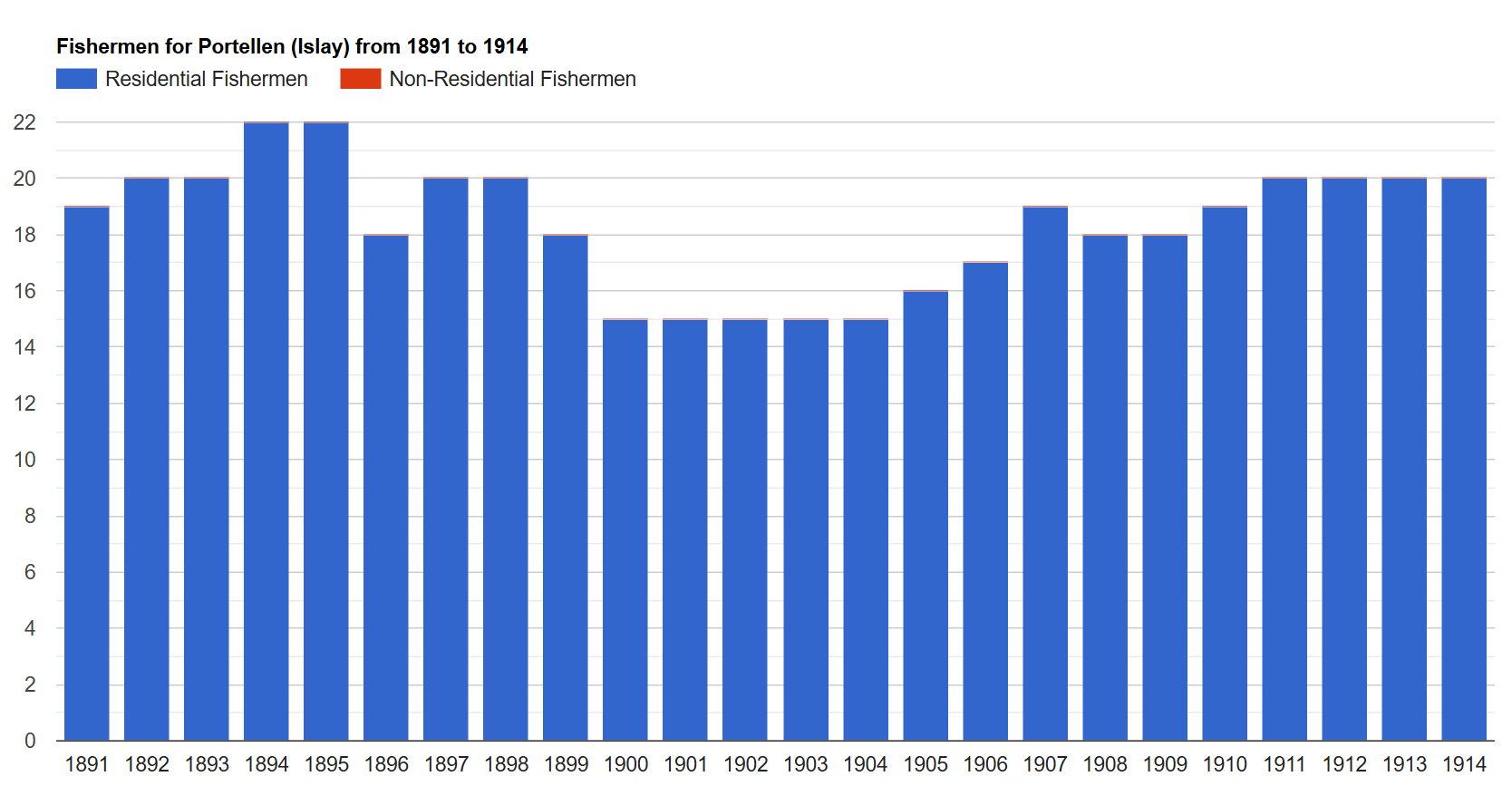
Fishermen

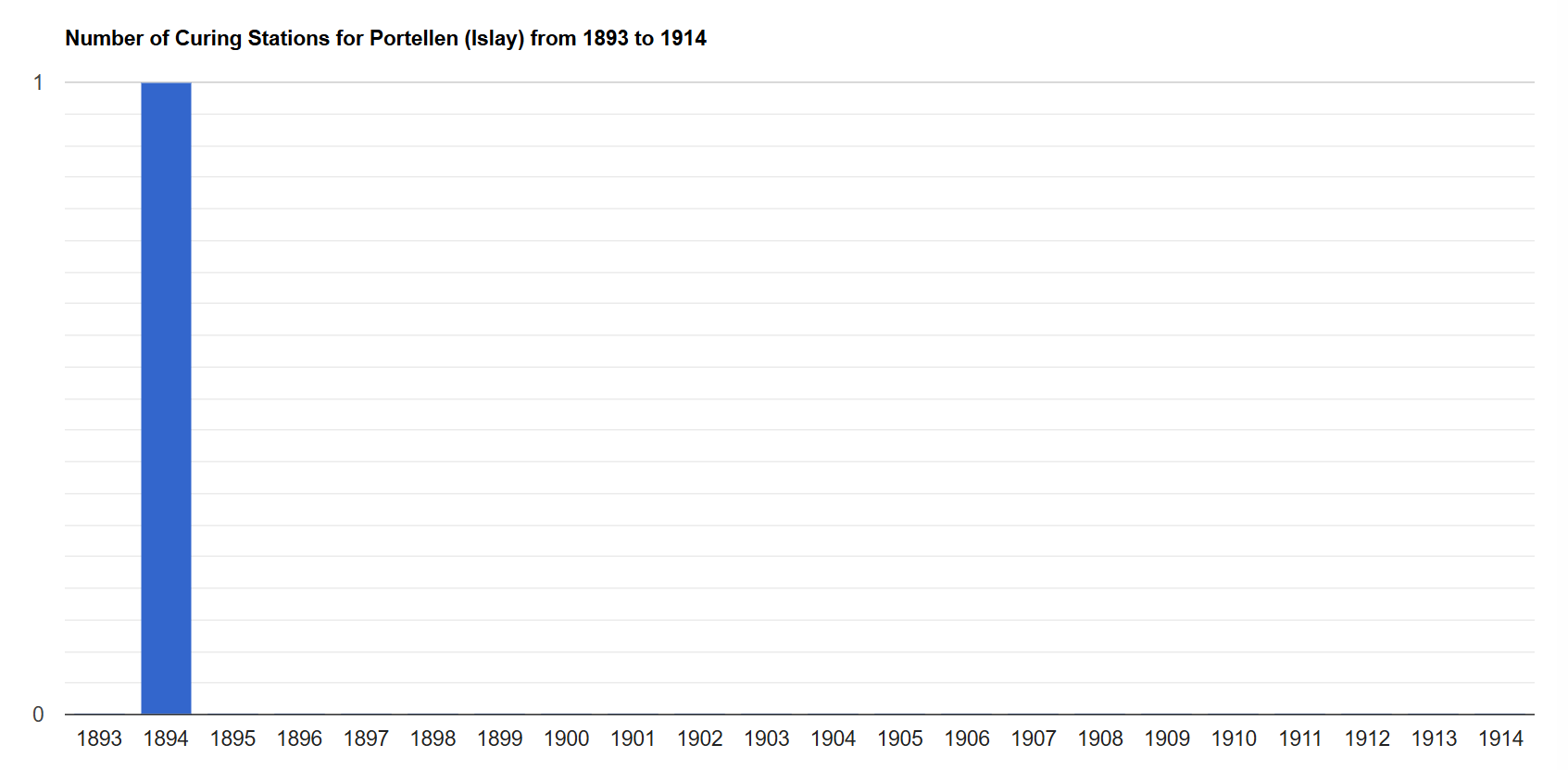
Number of curing stations

== Ferry service ==
Preceding station	Ferry	Following station
Terminus	Caledonian MacBrayne; Islay Ferry	Kennacraig
Terminus	Kintyre Express; April to October	Ballycastle

== Notable people ==
George Robertson, Baron Robertson of Port Ellen, Labour politician and former Secretary General of NATO was born in Port Ellen on 12 April 1946.

== See also ==
- St John's Church, Port Ellen
