= HMS Mallow (1915) =

Minesweeper of the Royal Navy

History

United Kingdom
- Name: HMS Mallow
- Builder: Barclay Curle, Glasgow
- Launched: 13 July 1915
- Fate: Transferred to Royal Australian Navy, 1919

History

Australia
- Name: HMAS Mallow
- Acquired: 1919
- Decommissioned: 20 November 1925
- Fate: Sunk as a target, 24 April 1935

General characteristics
- Class & type: Acacia-class sloop
- Displacement: 1,200 long tons (1,219 t)
- Length: 250 ft (76 m) p/p; 262 ft 6 in (80.01 m) o/a
- Beam: 33 ft (10 m)
- Draught: 12 ft (3.7 m)
- Propulsion: 1 × 4-cylinder triple expansion engine; 2 × cylindrical boilers; 1 screw
- Range: 2,000 nmi (3,700 km; 2,300 mi) at 15 kn (28 km/h; 17 mph) with max. 250 tons of coal
- Complement: 77
- Armament: 2 × 12-pdr (76 mm) guns; 2 × 3-pdr (47 mm) AA guns

HMS Mallow was an Acacia-class sloop built for the Royal Navy, and later operated by the Royal Australian Navy (RAN) as HMAS Mallow.

== Construction ==
Mallow was constructed by Barclay Curle at Glasgow in Scotland. She was launched on 13 July 1915.

== Operational history ==
=== World War I ===
During World War I, the sloop was tasked primarily with minesweeping. On 31 December 1915, Mallow picked up the bulk of the survivors of the passenger ship Persia (which had been torpedoed the day before off Crete) and conveyed them to Alexandria. In 1918, Mallow rescued the passengers of the French mailboat Djemnah, including future acting Governor-General of Madagascar Joseph Guyon, after the mailboat was torpedoed by a German U-boat. Mallow later received letters of commendation from the Admiralty and Guyon.

=== With the RAN ===
The sloop was transferred to the RAN in 1919.

== Decommissioning and fate ==
Mallow paid off to reserve on 18 October 1919, was decommissioned on 20 November 1925, and sunk as a target on 24 April 1935.
