= HMAS Marguerite =

1915 Arabis-class minesweeper

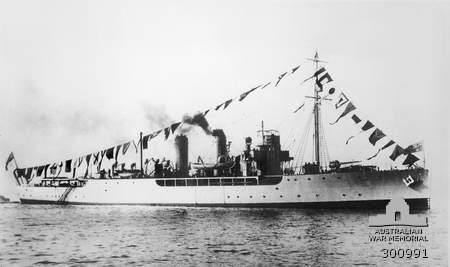
- HMAS Marguerite in 1920

History

United Kingdom
- Name: Marguerite
- Builder: Dunlop Bremner & Company, Port Glasgow, Scotland
- Laid down: July 1915
- Launched: 23 November 1915
- Fate: Transferred to Australia, 1919

Australia
- Name: Marguerite
- Acquired: 1919
- Commissioned: 17 January 1920
- Decommissioned: 23 July 1929
- Fate: Sunk as a target, 1 August 1935

General characteristics
- Class & type: Arabis-class sloop
- Displacement: 1,250 long tons (1,270 t)
- Length: 255 ft 3 in (77.80 m) p/p; 267 ft 9 in (81.61 m) o/a
- Beam: 33 ft 6 in (10.21 m)
- Draught: 11 ft 9 in (3.58 m)
- Propulsion: 1 × 4-cylinder triple expansion engine; 2 × cylindrical boilers; 1 screw
- Speed: 17 knots (31 km/h; 20 mph)
- Range: 2,000 nmi (3,700 km) at 15 kn (28 km/h; 17 mph) with max. 260 tons of coal
- Complement: 79
- Armament: 2 × 1 - QF 4 inch Mk IV guns, BL 4 inch Mk IX guns or QF 4.7 inch Mk IV guns and 2 × 1 - 3-pounders (47 mm) AA.

HMAS Marguerite was an Arabis-class sloop laid down for the Royal Navy by Dunlop Bremner & Company at Port Glasgow in Scotland in July 1915 and launched on 23 November 1915. She was transferred to Australia in 1919 and commissioned into the Royal Australian Navy on 17 January 1920, as HMAS Marguerite. After being paid off on 23 July 1929 she was sunk as a target on 1 August 1935.
