= List of ship names of the Royal Navy (A) =

This is a list of Royal Navy ship names starting with A.

== A ==
- A1
- A2
- A3
- A4
- A5
- A6
- A7
- A8
- A9
- A10
- A11
- A12
- A13
- Abbotsham
- Abdiel
- Abeille
- Abelard
- Abelia
- Abercrombie
- Aberdare
- Aberdeen
- Aberford
- Aberfoyle
- Abergavenny
- Abigail
- Abingdon
- Abondance
- Aboukir
- Abraham
- Abrams Offering
- Abundance
- Abyssinia
- Acacia
- Acadia
- Acanthus
- Acasta
- Ace
- Acertif
- Achates
- Acheron
- Achille
- Achilles
- Aconite
- Acorn
- Actaeon
- Actaeon II
- Acteon
- Actif
- Active
- Activity
- Acute
- Adam & Eve
- Adamant
- Adamant II
- Adda
- Adder
- Adelaide
- Adept
- Adjutant
- Admirable
- Admiral
- Admiral de Vries
- Admiral DeVries
- Admiral Farragut
- Admiralty
- Adonis
- Adur
- Advantage
- Advantagia
- Adventure
- Adventure Galley
- Adventure Prize
- Adventuress
- Adversary
- Advice
- Advice Prize
- Adviser
- Aegusa
- Aeneas
- Aeolus
- Aetna
- Affleck
- Affray
- Africa
- Africaine
- Afridi
- Afrikander
- Afrikander II
- Agamemnon
- Agate
- Agatha
- Aggressor
- Agile
- Agincourt
- Aglaia
- Aid
- Aigle
- Aimable
- Aimwell
- Ainthorpe
- Aire
- Airedale
- Aisne
- Ajax
- Ajdaha
- Akbar
- Akers
- Alaart
- Alacrity
- Aladar Youssanoff
- Aladdin
- Alamein
- Alaric
- Alarm
- Alarm II
- Alaunia
- Alaunia II
- Albacore
- Alban
- Albanaise
- Albany
- Albatross
- Albemarle
- Albert
- Albert Victor
- Alberta
- Albion
- Albion II
- Albion III
- Albrighton
- Albuera
- Albury
- Alca
- Alcantara
- Alcaston
- Alceste
- Alcestis
- Alcide
- Alcmene
- Aldborough
- Aldenham
- Alderney
- Aldgate
- Aldington
- Alecto
- Alert
- Alerte
- Alexander
- Alexandra
- Alexandre
- Alexandria
- Alfred
- Alfreda
- Alfriston
- Algerine
- Algiers
- Alice
- Alice & Francis
- Alisma
- Alkmaar
- Allart
- Allegiance
- Allepin
- Alliance
- Alligator
- Allington Castle
- Almanzora
- Alnwick Castle
- Alonzo
- Alouette
- Alphea
- Alpheus
- Alresford
- Alsatian
- Alsey
- Altais
- Altham
- Alton
- Alton Castle
- Alverton
- Alvinia
- Alynbank
- Alyssum
- Amalthaea
- Amaranthe
- Amaranthus
- Amaryllis
- Amazon
- Ambassador
- Amberley Castle
- Amberwitch
- Ambleside
- Amboyna
- Ambrose
- Ambuscade
- Ambush
- Ameer
- Amelia
- America
- Amersham
- Amerton
- Amethyst
- Amethyst III
- Amfitrite
- Amitie
- Amity
- Amokura
- Ampere
- Amphion
- Amphitrite
- Amsterdam
- Amy
- An 2
- Anacreon
- Anaconda
- Anchorite
- Anchusa
- Andania
- Andes
- Andrew
- Andromache
- Andromeda
- Anemone
- Angel
- Angelica
- Angler
- Anglesea
- Anglesey
- Anglia
- Angora
- Anguilla
- Anking
- Ann
- Ann & Christopher
- Ann & Judith
- Anna
- Anna Maria
- Anna Teresa
- Annan
- Annapolis
- Anne
- Anne Gallant
- Anne Galley
- Anne Royal
- Annet
- Anson
- Answer
- Ant
- Antaeus
- Antagonist
- Antares
- Antelope
- Anthony
- Anthony Bonaventure
- Antigua
- Antrim
- Antwerp
- Anzac
- Anzio
- Apelles
- Aphis
- Aphrodite
- Apollo
- Appleby Castle
- Appledore
- Appleton
- Approach
- Aquarius
- Aquilon
- Arab
- Arabis
- Arachne
- Aragonite
- Arawa
- Araxes
- Arbella
- Arbiter
- Arbroath
- Arbuthnot
- Arbutus
- Arcadian
- Arc-en-Ciel
- Archer
- Arcturus
- Ard Patrick
- Ardent
- Ardrossan
- Arethusa
- Arethuse
- Argenta
- Argo
- Argon
- Argonaut
- Argosy
- Argus
- Argyll
- Ariadne
- Ariel
- Aries
- Ariguani
- Ark Royal
- Arlingham
- Armada
- Armadale Castle
- Armeria
- Armide
- Arms of Holland
- Arms of Horn
- Arms of Rotterdam
- Arms of Terver
- Arno
- Arnprior
- Aro
- Arpha
- Arras
- Arrernte
- Arrogant
- Arrogante
- Arromanches
- Arrow
- Arrowhead
- Artemis
- Artful
- Artifex
- Artigo
- Artois
- Arun
- Arundel
- Arve Princen
- Ascension
- Ascot
- Asgard
- Ashanti
- Ashburton
- Asheldham
- Ashton
- Asia
- Asp
- Asperity
- Asphodel
- Assam
- Assault
- Assaye
- Assiduous
- Assistance
- Assistant
- Association
- Assurance
- Astarte
- Aster
- Aster II
- Astraea
- Astrea
- Astree
- Astronomer
- Asturias
- Astute
- Atalanta
- Atalante
- Atheling
- Atheleney
- Athene
- Athenian
- Athenien
- Athenienne
- Atherstone
- Athlete
- Atholl
- Atlantis
- Atlas
- Attack
- Attacker
- Attentive
- Attentive II
- Aubrietia
- Auckland
- Audacieux
- Audacious
- Audacity
- Augusta
- Auguste
- Augustine
- Augustus
- Auricula
- Auriga
- Aurochs
- Aurora
- Aurore
- Ausonia
- Austere
- Australia
- Autocarrier
- Autumn
- Aveley
- Avenger
- Aventurier
- Avernus
- Avon
- Avon Vale
- Awake
- Awe
- Axford
- Aydon Castle
- Aylmer
- Ayrshire
- Azalea
- Azov
- Aztec

== See also ==
- List of aircraft carriers of the Royal Navy
- List of amphibious warfare ships of the Royal Navy
- List of pre-dreadnought battleships of the Royal Navy
- List of dreadnought battleships of the Royal Navy
- List of battlecruisers of the Royal Navy
- List of cruiser classes of the Royal Navy
- List of destroyer classes of the Royal Navy
- List of patrol vessels of the Royal Navy
- List of frigate classes of the Royal Navy
- List of monitors of the Royal Navy
- List of mine countermeasure vessels of the Royal Navy (includes minesweepers and mine hunters)
- List of Royal Fleet Auxiliary ship names
- List of submarines of the Royal Navy
- List of survey vessels of the Royal Navy
- List of Royal Navy shore establishments
