= Alecto (disambiguation) =

Alecto may refer to:

- Alecto, one of the Greek Erinyes (Furies)
- Alecto (motorcycle), an English motorcycle manufactured in the immediate post-WW1 period
- Alecto (SPG), a self-propelled gun developed by the British during the Second World War
- HMS Alecto, any of 4 ships of the British Navy
- USS Alecto (AGP-14), originally projected as LST-977, a US motor torpedo boat tender
- Theretra alecto, the Levant hawk moth, a moth of the family Sphingidae
- Jamides alecto, the metallic cerulean, a small butterfly found in India that belongs to the lycaenids or blues family
- Pteropus alecto, the black flying fox, a megabat of the family Pteropodidae native to Australia and Southeast Asia
