= Ardent =

Ardent may refer to:

- Ardent spirit, liquors obtained after repeated distillations from fermented vegetables.
- Ardent (automobile), a French automobile produced from 1900 to 1901
- Ardent Computer, a graphics minicomputer manufacturing company
- Coast Entertainment, formerly Ardent Leisure, an Australian operator of theme parks and leisure venues
- Ardent Productions, a film recording company founded by H.R.H. Prince Edward, Duke of Edinburgh
- Ardent Records, a Memphis record label founded in 1959
- Ardent Studios, a professional recording studio in Memphis, Tennessee, in the United States
- HMS Ardent, several ships of the British Royal Navy
- USS Ardent, various United States Navy ships
- Ardent (Dungeons & Dragons), a character class in the Dungeons & Dragons role-playing game
- Ardent (marine salvage company), a major marine salvage company
