= Achates (disambiguation) =

Achates may refer to:

- Achates (Greek mythology)
- Achates, name of two ships
- Achates (river), the Sicilian river known in antiquity as the Achates
- 5144 Achates, an asteroid
- Agate, the gemstone called achates by Theophrastus and Pliny the Elder
- Leonardus Achates, the fifteenth century composer from Basel
- HMS Achates, the series of British Royal Navy ships named for after this character
- Achates Power, an American developer of engines
