= Assurance =

Assurance may refer to:

- Assurance (computer networking)
- Assurance (theology), a Protestant Christian doctrine
- Assurance services, offered by accountancy firms
- Life assurance, an insurance on human life
- Quality assurance
- Assurance IQ, Inc., a subsidiary of Prudential Financial

== Places ==
- Assurance, West Virginia, an unincorporated community in the United States
- Mount Assurance, New Hampshire, United States

== Ships ==
- HMS Assurance
- USS Assurance

== See also ==
- Insurance
