= A13 =

A13 or A-13 may refer to:

== Biology ==
- ATC code A13 Tonics, a subgroup of the Anatomical Therapeutic Chemical Classification System
- British NVC community A13 (Potamogeton perfoliatus - Myriophyllum alterniflorum community)
- Subfamily A13, a rhodopsin-like receptors subfamily

== Transportation ==
- A13 road, in several countries
- Archambault A13, a French sailboat design
- Antonov A-13, a 1958 Soviet acrobatic sailplane
- Chery A13, a subcompact car
- HMS A13, a British A-class submarine of the Royal Navy
- Northrop YA-13, a 1930s American attack aircraft prototype
- A-13 (tank), the General Staff specification covering three British cruiser tanks designed and built before and during the Second World War
  - Cruiser Mk III
  - Cruiser Mk IV
  - Covenanter tank

== Other uses ==
- English Opening in chess (Encyclopaedia of Chess Openings code A13, among others)
- Apple A13, a system on a chip mobile processor designed by Apple
- Samsung Galaxy A13, a smartphone manufactured by Samsung Electronics
