= Adder (disambiguation) =

Vipera berus, the common European adder, is a snake found in Europe and northern Asia.

Adder may also refer to:

- AA-12 Adder, a Russian air-to-air missile
- Adder (electronics), an electronic circuit designed to do addition
- Adder Technology, a manufacturing company
- Armstrong Siddeley Adder, a late 1940s British turbojet engine
- HMS Adder, any of seven ships of the Royal Navy
- Any of several groups of venomous snakes
- USS Adder, a US submarine

== See also ==
- Addition, a mathematical operation
