= Antrim =

Antrim may refer to:

== People ==
- Donald Antrim (born 1958), American writer
- "Henry Antrim", an alias used by Henry McCarty, better known as Billy the Kid, a 19th-century outlaw
- Harry Antrim (1884–1967) vaudeville, film and television actor (sometimes billed as "Henry Antrim")
- Minna Antrim (1861–1950), American writer
- Richard Antrim (1907–1969), a rear admiral in the United States Navy

== Places ==
=== Canada ===
- Antrim, Nova Scotia
- Antrim, Ontario, now part of the city of Ottawa

=== Northern Ireland ===
- County Antrim, one of the counties of Northern Ireland
- Antrim, County Antrim, the town
- Antrim railway station, serving the town of Antrim
- Antrim (borough), an administrative division
- Antrim GAA, the Gaelic football, hurling or any other sporting teams fielded by the Antrim County Board of the Gaelic Athletic Association
  - Antrim county football team
- Former constituencies:
  - Antrim (UK Parliament constituency)
  - Antrim (Northern Ireland Parliament constituency)
  - Antrim Borough (Northern Ireland Parliament constituency)
  - County Antrim (Parliament of Ireland constituency)
  - Antrim (Parliament of Ireland constituency)

=== United States ===
- Antrim (Taneytown, Maryland), listed on the NRHP in Maryland
- Antrim, Michigan
- Antrim, New Hampshire, a New England town
  - Antrim (CDP), New Hampshire, the main village in the town
- Antrim, New York, a hamlet in Ramapo, New York
- Antrim, Ohio, a hamlet in Madison Township, Guernsey County
- Antrim, Pennsylvania, in Tioga County
- Antrim, Texas, a ghost town also known as Pleasant Hill
- Antrim County, Michigan
- Antrim Township, Michigan
- Antrim Township, Watonwan County, Minnesota
- Antrim Township, Pennsylvania
- Antrim Township, Wyandot County, Ohio

== Ships and boats ==
- USS Antrim (FFG-20), named after Richard Antrim
- HMS Antrim, two ships of the Royal Navy, named after County Antrim
- Antrim 20, an American sailboat design

== Other ==
- Battle of Antrim, during the Irish Rebellion of 1798
