= Anglesea =

Anglesea may refer to:

== Places ==
- Anglesea (modern spelling Anglesey), an island off the northwest coast of Wales
- Anglesea, New Jersey, an unincorporated community in the US
  - Anglesea Borough, New Jersey, former borough, currently part of North Wildwood, New Jersey, US
- Anglesea, Victoria, an Australian town

== People ==
- Pete Anglesea (born 1971), English rugby union player

== Ships ==
- HMS Anglesea, multiple ships of the Royal Navy
- Marquis of Anglesea (1815 ship), wrecked in 1829

== Sports ==
- Anglesea Football Club, an Australian rules football club in the Australian state of Victoria
- Anglesea Road Cricket Ground, in Dublin, Ireland

== Other ==
- Anglesea (EP), a 2011 EP by King Gizzard & the Lizard Wizard
- Anglesea Barracks, in central Hobart, Tasmania
- Anglesea Heath, in the Australian state of Victoria
- Anglesea River, in the Australian state of Victoria
- Anglesea Road, in Dublin, Ireland

== See also ==
- Anglesey (disambiguation)
