= Arbutus (disambiguation) =

Arbutus may refer to:

In botany

- Arbutus, a genus of trees in the family Ericaceae
- Arbutus menziesii or Pacific Madrone, commonly known as Arbutus in British Columbia
- Epigaea repens, known as arbutus or trailing arbutus, a wild plant of the heath family
- Arbutus unedo, the strawberry tree, sometimes simply referred to as the Arbutus
- A common mistranslation from Chinese of Myrica rubra (Chinese bayberry)

In geography

- Arbutus, Maryland, an unincorporated community in the United States
- Arbutus Beach, Michigan, an unincorporated community in the United States
- Arbutus, British Columbia, a former post office in the Cowichan Valley on Vancouver Island, British Columbia
- Arbutus Bay, a bay on the south side of Bowen Island, British Columbia
- Arbutus Cove, a cove in Saanich, British Columbia, between Ten Mile Point and Gordon Head
- Arbutus Creek, a creek in British Columbia, entering the head of Finlayson Inlet on Vancouver Island
- Arbutus Grove Provincial Park, a provincial park on the south side of Nanoose Harbour, British Columbia
- Arbutus Island, a small island near Swartz Bay on Vancouver Island, British Columbia
- Arbutus Point, a headland on Vancouver Island near Crofton, British Columbia
- Arbutus Ridge, a neighbourhood within the City of Vancouver, British Columbia
- Arbutus Summit, a mountain near Port Alberni, British Columbia, Canada

Other

- Arbutus (Aladdin), a cartoon villain from Disney's Aladdin
- Arbutus Records, a Montreal-based record label
- HMS Arbutus, various Royal Navy ships
- HMNZS Arbutus (K403), a corvette of the Royal New Zealand Navy 1944-48
- Arbutus Foundation, a nonprofit founded by David Byrne
