= Acasta =

Acasta may refer to:

- Acasta (crustacean), a genus of barnacles
- HMS Acasta, various ships
- Acasta-class destroyers, First World War ships
- Acasta Gneiss, Canadian rock body

== See also ==
Acaste (Oceanid) - a figure in Greek Mythology, also known as Acasta
