= Albacore (disambiguation) =

The albacore is a species of tuna.

Albacore may also refer to:

== Naval vessels ==
- HMS Albacore, various British Royal Navy ships
- Albacore-class gunboat (1855), built for the Royal Navy for the Crimean War
- Albacore-class gunboat (1883), built for the Royal Navy
- USS Albacore (SP-751), a patrol vessel in commission from 1917 to 1919
- USS Albacore (SS-218), a submarine which served in the Pacific theater during World War II
- USS Albacore (AGSS-569), an experimental submarine in commission from 1953 to 1972

== Other uses ==
- Fairey Albacore, a torpedo bomber built by Fairey Aviation during the Second World War
- Albacore (dinghy), a sailboat racing dinghy
