= Ardor =

Ardor or Ardour may refer to:

- Ardor (album), a 1994 album by Love Spirals Downwards
- Ardour (album), a 2010 album by instrumental hip hop/electronica producer Teebs
- Ardor (film), a 2002 South Korean film, also known as Milae
- Ardour (software), a hard disk recorder and digital audio workstation application
- Ardour (river), a river in southwestern France
- Ardore, a town in Calabria, Italy
- Ardor: The Book of the Dead Man, Vol. 2, a book of poems by Marvin Bell
- Ada or Ardor: A Family Chronicle, a novel by Vladimir Nabokov

== See also ==
- Ardent (disambiguation)
- Passion (emotion), very strong feeling
