= Arrogance (disambiguation) =

Arrogance, or hubris, is a personality quality of extreme or excessive pride.

Arrogance or Arrogant may also refer to:

== Music ==
- Arrogance (band), an American rock band active since the 1970s
- "Arrogance", a 1992 song by Prince from Love Symbol
- Arrogant (EP), a 2014 EP by Medina

== Ships ==
- HMS Arrogant, several ships of the Royal Navy
- Arrogant-class cruiser, a class of Royal Navy protected cruisers
- Arrogant-class ship of the line, a class of Royal Navy 74-gun third rate ships

== Other uses ==
- Arrogance, a 1990 novel by Joanna Scott
- The Arrogant, a 1987 American action-thriller film

== See also ==
- Pride
