= HMAS Aware =

1967 Attack-class patrol vessel

History

Australia
- Builder: Evans Deakin and Company
- Laid down: July 1967
- Launched: 7 October 1967
- Commissioned: 21 June 1968
- Decommissioned: 17 July 1993
- Motto: "Forever Alert"
- Fate: Scrapped 2011
- Badge

General characteristics
- Class & type: Attack-class patrol boat
- Displacement: 100 tons standard; 146 tons full load
- Length: 107.6 ft (32.8 m) length overall
- Beam: 20 ft (6.1 m)
- Draught: 6.4 ft (2.0 m) at standard load; 7.3 ft (2.2 m) at full load
- Propulsion: 2 × 16-cylinder Paxman YJCM diesel engines; 3,460 shp (2,580 kW); 2 shafts
- Speed: 24 knots (44 km/h; 28 mph)
- Range: 1,200 nautical miles (2,200 km; 1,400 mi) at 13 knots (24 km/h; 15 mph)
- Complement: 3 officers, 16 sailors
- Armament: 1 × Bofors 40 mm gun; 2 × .50-calibre M2 Browning machine guns; Small arms

HMAS Aware (P 91) was an Attack-class patrol boat of the Royal Australian Navy (RAN).

== Design and construction ==
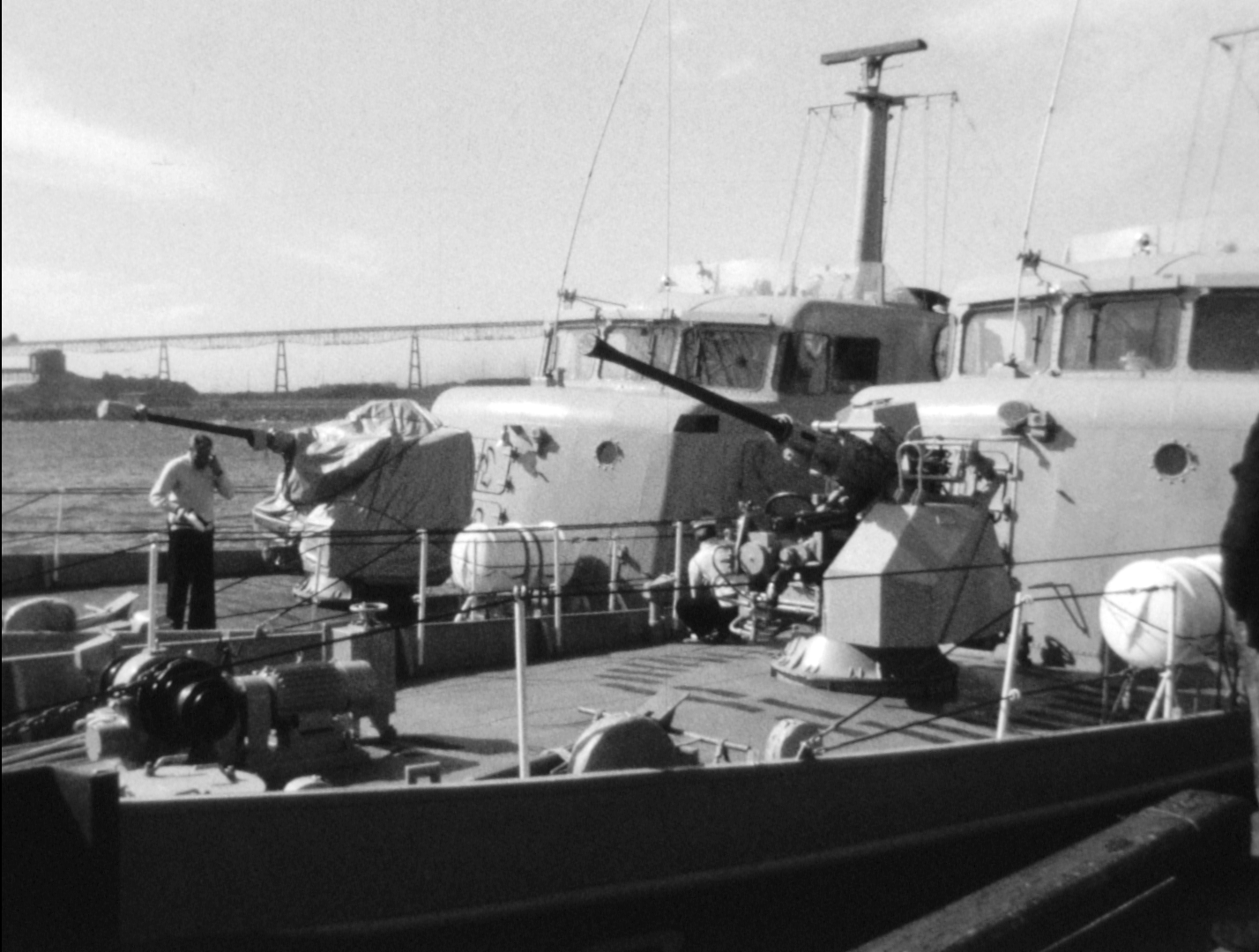
HMAS Aware (left) alongside HMAS Archer in Port Kembla Harbour, August 1968

The Attack class was ordered in 1964 to operate in Australian waters as patrol boats (based on lessons learned through using the Ton-class minesweepers on patrols of Borneo during the Indonesia-Malaysia Confrontation, and to replace a variety of old patrol, search-and-rescue, and general-purpose craft. Initially, nine were ordered for the RAN, with another five for Papua New Guinea's Australian-run coastal security force, although another six ships were ordered to bring the class to twenty vessels. The patrol boats had a displacement of 100 tons at standard load and 146 tons at full load, were 107.6 feet (32.8 m) in length overall, had a beam of 20 feet (6.1 m), and draughts of 6.4 feet (2.0 m) at standard load, and 7.3 feet (2.2 m) at full load. Propulsion machinery consisted of two 16-cylinder Paxman YJCM diesel engines, which supplied 3,460 shaft horsepower (2,580 kW) to the two propellers. The vessels could achieve a top speed of 24 knots (44 km/h; 28 mph), and had a range of 1,200 nautical miles (2,200 km; 1,400 mi) at 13 knots (24 km/h; 15 mph). The ship's company consisted of three officers and sixteen sailors. Main armament was a bow-mounted Bofors 40 mm gun, supplemented by two .50-calibre M2 Browning machine guns and various small arms. The ships were designed with as many commercial components as possible: the Attacks were to operate in remote regions of Australia and New Guinea, and a town's hardware store would be more accessible than home base in a mechanical emergency.

Aware was laid down by Evans Deakin and Company at Brisbane in Queensland in July 1967, launched on 7 October 1967 and commissioned on 21 June 1968.

== Operational history ==
On November the 24th 1970 while with HMAS Adroit on SAR duties, Aware assisted in an attempt to salvage a ditched helicopter from HMAS Albatross after a Westland Wessex crashed.

Aware was transferred to the Adelaide Port Division of the Royal Australian Navy Reserve in November 1982.

== Decommissioning and civilian service ==
HMAS Aware was the last of her class to be withdrawn from service, decommissioned on 17 July 1993. She was sold to a private owner sometime before 1998, and after modification in Melbourne (including an extension of the superstructure to cover the quarterdeck), was used as a diving and salvage ship.

In 2006, Aware was acquired by a group of investors, and sailed to Bundaberg, Queensland by a former crewmember. The investors withdrew support shortly after, and the former crew member took over ownership of the vessel. Aware fell into disrepair, and in 2010, the Bundaberg Magistrates Court fined the owner for failing to have the ship insured. According to the owner, the lack of facilities capable of handling the former patrol boat has made insurance inspections almost impossible. A buyer for the vessel could not be found and in December 2011 the vessel was scrapped.
