= Ynys Môn =

Ynys Môn may refer to:

- Anglesey (Welsh: Ynys Môn), an island of north-west Wales in the Irish Sea
  - Ynys Môn (UK Parliament constituency), the island's House of Commons electoral seat
  - Ynys Môn (Senedd constituency), its former coterminous seat in the Senedd (Welsh Parliament)
  - Isle of Anglesey County Council, the local government authority for the island

== See also ==
- Mon (disambiguation)
- Anglesey (disambiguation)
