= HMS Alarm =

Ten ships of the Royal Navy have borne the name HMS Alarm, whilst another was planned but later cancelled:

- HMS Alarm (1758) was a 32-gun fifth rate frigate, launched in 1758. She was the first Royal Navy ship to have a fully copper sheathed hull. She was broken up in 1812.
- HMS Alarm (1763) was a 4-gun cutter purchased in 1763 and sold in 1780.
- HM galley Alarm was a galley purchased in 1777 and scuttled to avoid capture in July 1778.
- HMS Alarm (1799) was a 24-gun sixth rate captured from the Dutch in 1799, and renamed Helder and then Heldin in 1800 and sold in 1802.
- HMS Alarm (1810) was a lugger of eight carronades transferred from Customs in 1810 and returned to Customs in 1812 or 1813.
- HMS Alarm was to be a 28-gun sixth rate laid down in 1832 and cancelled later that year.
- HMS Alarm (1845) was a 28-gun sixth rate launched in 1845. She was converted into a coal hulk in 1860 and sold in 1904.
- HMS Alarm (1892) was an Alarm-class torpedo gunboat, launched in 1892 and sold in 1907.
- HMS Alarm (1910) was an Acorn-class destroyer, launched in 1910 and sold in 1921.
- HMS Alarm (1940) was the former Saint-class naval tug Saint Ewe built in 1919 and hired from the Iraqi Government in 1940 as a minesweeper; renamed Alarm II in 1942 and returned in 1946.
- HMS Alarm (J140) was an Algerine-class minesweeper launched in 1942, damaged by German aircraft in 1943, and declared a constructive total loss. She was scrapped in 1944.
