= HMS Amaryllis =

Two ships of the Royal Navy have been named HMS Amaryllis :

- HMS Amaryllis (1915) an Arabis-class sloop launched in 1915 and sold in 1923
- HMS Amaryllis, a Flower-class corvette cancelled before being laid down. Subsequently, re-ordered as the Castle-class corvette HMS Allington Castle
