= HMS Alban =

Three ships of the Royal Navy have borne the name HMS Alban. Another was planned but never completed:

- HMS Alban (1806) was a 10-gun schooner launched in 1806. She was in Danish hands between 1810 and 1811 and was wrecked on 18 December 1812 at Aldeburgh, Suffolk during a storm; only one seaman and a woman survived.
- HMS Alban (1813) was a 14-gun schooner, previously the American 4-gun letter of marque William Bayard, launched in New York in 1812, that the British Royal Navy captured in 1813 and took into service. She had an unexceptionable career and was broken up in 1822.
- HMS Alban (1826) was a wooden paddle vessel launched in 1826, later rebuilt, and finally broken up in 1860.
- HMS Alban was to have been a Philomel-class gunvessel. She was laid down in 1860 but cancelled in 1863.

== See also ==
- HMS Albanaise
- HMS Albany
- HMS St Albans
