= Anglesey (disambiguation) =

Anglesey is an island and county of Wales.

Anglesey may also refer to:

== Communities ==
- Anglesey, Staffordshire, a civil parish in England
- Anglesey, a railway point in British Columbia, Canada
- County of Anglesey, Victoria, Australia

== Industry ==
- Anglesey Aluminium, a metal manufacturer in Wales
- Anglesey Coalfield, in Wales
- Anglesey Mining, a mining company based in Wales

== Sports ==
- Anglesey Circuit, a motor racing circuit in Wales
- Anglesey League, a former football (soccer) league in Wales
- Anglesey Stakes, a horse race in Ireland

== Titles ==
- Earl of Anglesey, a defunct hereditary title in the Peerage of England
  - Countess of Anglesey (disambiguation), a title normally given to the wife of the Earl of Anglesey
- Marquess of Anglesey, an extant hereditary title of British peerage seated on the Welsh island

== Transportation ==
- Anglesey Airport, an airport owned by the Isle of Anglesey County Council
- Anglesey Central Railway, a former standard-gauge railway in Wales
- Anglesey Sidings, a former part of a railway terminal in the West Midlands, England
- TSS Anglesey (1887), a steam turbine cargo vessel scrapped in 1910

== Other ==
- Anglesey Abbey, northeast of Cambridge, England
- Anglesey Coastal Path, in Wales
- Anglesey Sea Zoo, in Wales

== See also ==
- Anglesea (disambiguation)
