= HMS Albany =

Three ships of the Royal Navy have borne the name HMS Albany:

- HMS Albany (1745) was a 14-gun sloop launched in 1745 and captured by the French in 1746.
- HMS Albany (1747) was a 14-gun sloop, launched as Tavistock 1745. She was renamed in 1747 and was sold in 1763.
- HMS Albany (1776) was the ex-American Rittenhouse. She was purchased in 1776 and broken up in 1780.

== See also ==
- HMS Alban
- HMAS Albany
