= HMAS Adroit =

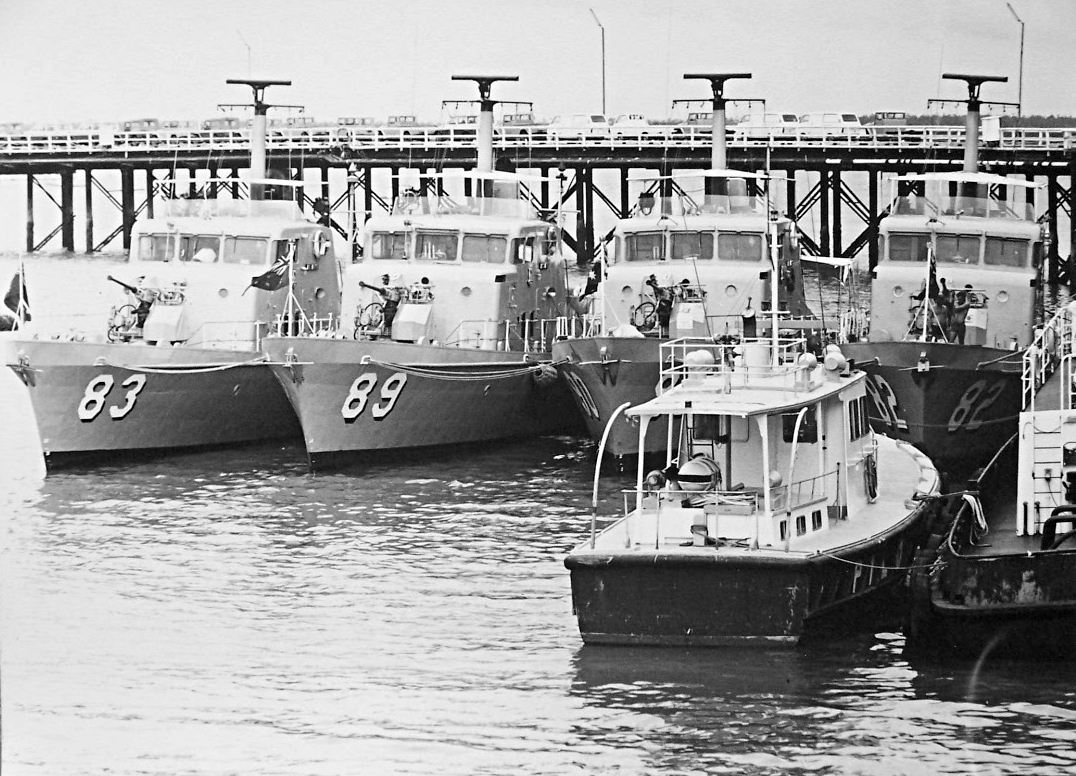
- HMAS Adroit (at right) with three other Attack-class patrol boats

History

Australia
- Builder: Evans Deakin and Company
- Laid down: August 1967
- Launched: 3 February 1968
- Commissioned: 17 August 1968
- Decommissioned: 28 March 1992
- Motto: "Quick and Secure"
- Fate: Sunk as target
- Badge

General characteristics
- Class & type: Attack-class patrol boat
- Displacement: 100 tons standard; 146 tons full load
- Length: 107.6 ft (32.8 m) length overall
- Beam: 20 ft (6.1 m)
- Draught: 6.4 ft (2.0 m) at standard load; 7.3 ft (2.2 m) at full load
- Propulsion: 2 × 16-cylinder Paxman YJCM diesel engines; 3,460 shp (2,580 kW); 2 shafts
- Speed: 24 knots (44 km/h; 28 mph)
- Range: 1,200 nmi (2,200 km; 1,400 mi) at 13 knots (24 km/h; 15 mph)
- Complement: 3 officers, 16 sailors
- Armament: 1 × Bofors 40 mm gun; 2 × .50-calibre M2 Browning machine guns; Small arms

HMAS Adroit (P 82) was an Attack-class patrol boat of the Royal Australian Navy (RAN).

== Design and construction ==
The Attack class was ordered in 1964 to operate in Australian waters as patrol boats, based on lessons learned through using the Ton-class minesweepers on patrols around Borneo during the Indonesia-Malaysia Confrontation, and to replace a variety of old patrol, search-and-rescue, and general-purpose craft. Initially, nine were ordered for the RAN, with another five for Papua New Guinea's Australian-run coastal security force, although another six ships were ordered to bring the class to twenty vessels. The patrol boats had a displacement of 100 tons at standard load and 146 tons at full load, were 107.6 feet (32.8 m) in length overall, had a beam of 20 feet (6.1 m), and draughts of 6.4 feet (2.0 m) at standard load, and 7.3 feet (2.2 m) at full load. Their propulsion machinery consisted of two 16-cylinder Paxman YJCM diesel engines, which supplied 3,460 shaft horsepower (2,580 kW) to the two propellers. The vessels could achieve a top speed of 24 knots (44 km/h; 28 mph), and had a range of 1,200 nautical miles (2,200 km; 1,400 mi) at 13 knots (24 km/h; 15 mph). The ship's company consisted of three officers and sixteen sailors. The main armament was a bow-mounted Bofors 40 mm gun, which was supplemented by two .50-calibre M2 Browning machine guns and various small arms. The ships were designed with as many commercial components as possible: the Attacks were to operate in remote regions of Australia and New Guinea, and a town's hardware store would be more accessible than home base in a mechanical emergency.

Adroit was laid down by Evans Deakin and Company at Brisbane, Queensland, in August 1967. She was launched on 3 March 1968 and commissioned on 17 August 1968.

== Operational history ==
After commissioning, Adroit conducted work-up trials in and around Jervis Bay. While engaged in search and rescue duties on 24 November 1970, Adroit, along with HMAS Aware unsuccessfully attempted to salvage a Westland Wessex helicopter from nearby HMAS Albatross that had ditched offshore. The helicopter sank while under tow.

After the conclusion of sea trials, the patrol boat was based out of HMAS Moreton until 1975, when following a refit in Sydney, she sailed for Darwin and would spend the next 8 years in waters off northern Australia engaged in fishery patrols and exercises.

In 1979, her Commanding Officer, Lieutenant John Napier, faced a court-martial for nine charges of conduct unbecoming an officer, four of receiving stolen property and two of assault. The charges followed an investigation into a report from the master of the Taiwanese fishing vessel Fu Yuan, alleging that cash and several items were stolen during an armed boarding by crew from Adroit on 8 November 1978.. Napier was found guilty and was dismissed from the Navy, having admitted to his superiors that he was aware that pilfering had been occurring during boardings, but failed to act to stop it.

The patrol boat was transferred to the Fremantle Port Division of the Royal Australian Navy Reserve in March 1983.

== Fate ==
Adroit paid off on 28 March 1992. The patrol boat was sunk as a target by A-4 Skyhawk aircraft of No. 2 Squadron RNZAF on 8 August 1994. The wreck is located in the Rottnest ship graveyard, west of Rottnest Island.
