= USS Assurance =

USS Assurance is a name used more than once by the US Navy:

- USS Assurance (MSO-521), a fleet minesweeper commissioned at Boston, Massachusetts, on 21 November 1958.
- USNS Assurance (T-AGOS-5), an ocean surveillance ship delivered to the Military Sealift Command on 1 May 1985, taken out of service in 1995, and transferred to Portugal in 1999.
