= HMS Abundance =

Two ships of the Royal Navy have been named HMS Abundance:

- HMS Abundance (1799) was a store-ship launched and purchased in 1799; she was sold in May 1823.
- HMS Abundance (1855) was an iron-hulled screw-driven store-ship purchased in January 1855 as HMS Alfred, renamed HMS Abundance in February of that year and sold in 1856.

== See also ==
- Abondance (1780 ship) was a French transport launched in 1780 that the British captured in 1781, took into service as HMS Abondance, and then sold in 1784.
