= HMS Albion =

Nine ships of the Royal Navy have borne the name HMS Albion after Albion, an archaic name for Great Britain:

- HMS Albion (1763) was a 74-gun third-rate ship of the line launched in 1763. She was converted into a floating battery in 1794 and was wrecked in 1797.
- HMS Albion (1798) was the mercantile Albion launched at Sunderland in 1797 that the Royal Navy purchased in 1798 for service as a sloop. The Navy sold her at Sheerness in 1803. She became a transport. It is possible that she foundered in August 1808.
- HMS Albion (1802) was a 74-gun third rate launched in 1802. She was used for harbour service from 1831 and was broken up in 1836.
- HMS Albion (1842) was a 90-gun second rate launched in 1842. She was converted to screw propulsion in 1861 and was broken up in 1884.
- HMS Albion (1898) was a Canopus-class pre-dreadnought battleship launched in 1898 and sold in 1919.
- HMS Albion (R07) was a Centaur-class aircraft carrier launched in 1947. She was converted into a commando carrier in 1962, sold in 1973, resold later that year and then broken up, all in 1973.
- HMS Albion (L14) is an Albion-class Landing Platform Dock ship launched in 2001, decommissioned 2025.

Other RN vessels named "Albion" were;

- Albion II, an armed trawler taken up in 1915 and sunk by a mine in 1916.
- Albion II, a Bristol paddle steamer used for minesweeping in 1915.
- Albion III, a steam yacht, taken up from 1916 to 1919.

== Hired armed vessels ==
- Between 27 April 1793 and 11 September 1794, the Navy employed a ship named Albion, of 393 tons burthen.
- During the period of the Napoleonic Wars, the Royal Navy twice hired armed cutters named Albion, though these are probably the same vessel. See: Hired armed cutter Albion.

== Battle honours ==
- Algiers 1816
- Navarino 1827
- Crimea 1854–5
- Dardanelles 1915

== See also ==
- Albion (disambiguation)
