= HMS A5 =

Submarine of the Royal Navy

History

United Kingdom
- Name: HMS A5
- Laid down: 19 February 1902
- Launched: March 1904
- Commissioned: 11 February 1905
- Decommissioned: December 1915
- Fate: Scrapped in 1920 at Portsmouth Dockyard

General characteristics
- Class & type: A-class submarine
- Displacement: 190 tons surfaced; 207 tons submerged
- Length: 105.25 ft (32.08 m)
- Beam: 12.75 ft (3.89 m)
- Draught: 10.5 ft (3.2 m)
- Propulsion: 550 hp (410 kW) petrol engine; 150 hp (110 kW) electric engine
- Speed: 11 knots (20 km/h; 13 mph) maximum surfaced*8 knots (15 km/h; 9.2 mph) maximum submerged
- Range: 325 nautical miles (602 km; 374 mi) at 11 kn (20 km/h; 13 mph) surfaced; 20 nautical miles (37 km; 23 mi) at 6 kn (11 km/h; 6.9 mph) submerged
- Complement: 11 (2 officers and 9 ratings)
- Armament: 2 × 18 in (450 mm) torpedo tubes, plus two reloads

HMS A5 was an early Royal Navy submarine. She was a member of Group Two of the first British A class of submarines. Like all members of her class, she was built at Vickers Barrow-in-Furness.

== Design and construction ==
The A-class was designed by Vickers as an improvement on the previous American designed Holland-class submarines, and were the first class of British-designed submarines. Four submarines, A1–A4, were ordered as part of the 1902–1903 construction programme for the Royal Navy, with a further nine (A5–A13) ordered under the 1903–1904 programme. The design of the submarines was revised between the prototype boat, A1, and the other three submarines of the first order, and again for the submarines of the 1903–04 programme, with this batch being fitted with a second torpedo tube.

A5 was 105 feet 0 1/2 inch (32.0 m) long overall, with a beam of 12 feet 8 3/4 inches (3.9 m) and a draught of 10 feet 1 inch (3.1 m) when surfaced. Displacement was about 190 long tons (190 t) surfaced and 205–207 long tons (208–210 t) submerged. A 550 horsepower (410 kW) 16-cylinder Wolsey petrol engine powered the submarine on the surface, driving the submarine's single propeller shaft, while submerged propulsion was via a 150 horsepower (110 kW) electric motor, giving a speed of 11.5 knots (13.2 mph; 21.3 km/h) on the surface and 7 knots (8.1 mph; 13 km/h) dived. Armament was two 18 inch (45.7 cm) torpedo tubes in the ship's bow. Four torpedoes were carried.

A5 was laid down at Vicker's Barrow-in-Furness shipyard in 1903, was launched on 3 March 1904 and completed on 11 February 1905.

== Service history ==
Immediately after commissioning she and her tender HMS Hazard travelled to Queenstown, (now Cobh) Ireland. On 16 February 1905 at 10:05 whilst tied up alongside Hazard an explosion occurred on board, with a second explosion about 30 minutes later. Five of the crew were killed by the explosion. The captain, Lieutenant H J G Good, and the other four crew members survived.

An enquiry into the accident concluded that petrol fumes had been ignited by an electrical spark, with the second explosion caused by smouldering debris from the first event.

She was returned to Barrow-in-Furness the following month for repairs and returned to service in the Home Fleet in October. She was used for training until paid off for disposal in December 1915 and was finally broken up in Portsmouth in 1920.

== Memorial ==
The Irish Naval Service donated a granite block with a brass plaque giving details of the A5 tragedy, and this was unveiled in March 2000.

On 13 February 2005 there was a ceremony to mark the centenary of the accident. LÉ Eithne of the Irish Naval Service and HMS Richmond of the Royal Navy visited Cobh for the occasion.
