= Ardent (automobile) =

Overview
- Manufacturer: Caron et Cie
- Production: 1900–1901
- Assembly: Paris, France

Body and chassis
- Class: Light car
- Body style: Four-seater vis-à-vis

Powertrain
- Engine: 5 hp V-twin
- Transmission: 3-speed manual

The Ardent was an automobile produced by Caron et Cie, in Paris, from 1900 to 1901. The company used its own make of 5 hp v-twin engine in their four-seater vis-à-vis light car. Termed a "victoriette", it was unusual in that the body was mounted on a frame, but the engine was in front of the frame, unsuspended.
