= HMS Auckland =

Two ships of the Royal Navy have been named HMS Auckland:

- HMS Auckland (1840) was a Bombay frigate launched in 1840
- HMS Auckland (L61) was an Egret-class sloop, launched in 1938 and sunk in 1941
