= Ardent spirit =

Alchemical classification

Ardent spirits (ethyl alcohol), in alchemy, are those liquors obtained after repeated distillations from fermented vegetables. They are thus called because they will take fire and burn. Examples include brandy, spirits of wine, etc.
