= USS Alecto =

Tender of the United States Navy

- USS Alecto (AGP-14) underway in Chesapeake Bay off Bethlehem Fairfield Shipyard, Baltimore, Maryland, 7 August 1945, just after completion of conversion. The second (starboard) "A" frame hoist is clearly visible.

History

United States
- Name: Alecto
- Namesake: Alecto
- Builder: Bethlehem-Hingham Shipyard, Hingham, Massachusetts
- Yard number: 3447
- Laid down: 12 December 1944
- Launched: 15 January 1945
- Commissioned: 8 February 1945, partial commission; 28 July 1945, full commission
- Decommissioned: 23 February 1945; 28 June 1946
- Stricken: 28 June 1947
- Identification: Hull symbol: LST-977; Hull symbol: AGP-15; Code letters: NJYB
- Fate: Transferred to Turkey, 10 May 1948
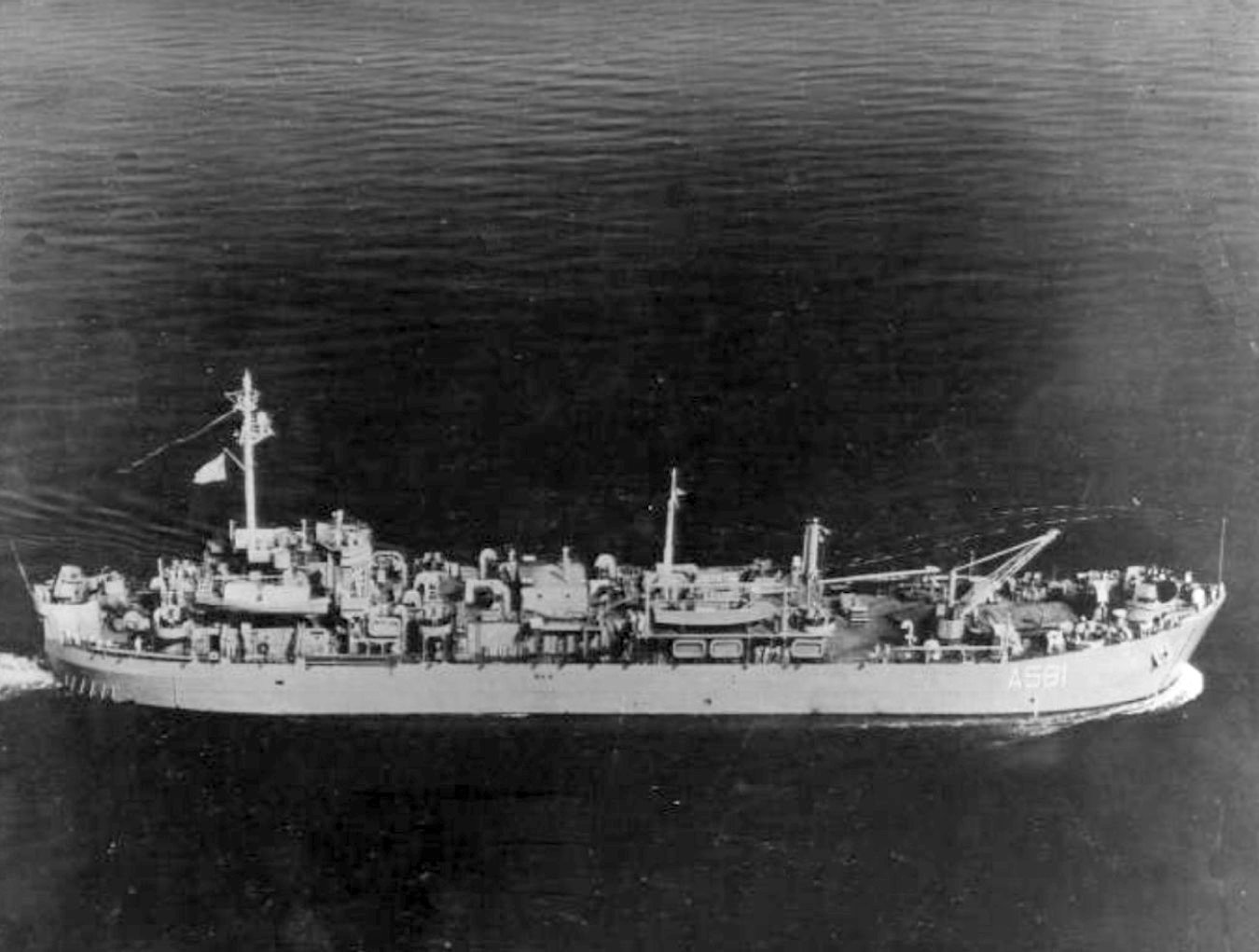
- TCG Onaran (A581) underway, date and location unknown. Note the A-frame cranes have been eliminated.

Turkey
- Name: Onaran
- Acquired: 10 May 1948
- Identification: Hull symbol: A581
- Fate: Scrapped 1993

General characteristics
- Class & type: Portunus-class motor torpedo boat tender
- Displacement: 4,100 long tons (4,200 t)
- Length: 328 ft (100 m) oa
- Beam: 50 ft (15 m)
- Draft: 11 ft 2 in (3.40 m)
- Installed power: 2 × 900 hp (670 kW) Electro-Motive Diesel 12-567A diesel engines; 1,800 shp (1,300 kW)
- Propulsion: 1 × Falk main reduction gears; 2 × Propellers
- Speed: 11.6 kn (21.5 km/h; 13.3 mph)
- Boats & landing craft carried: 2 x LCVPs
- Complement: 41 officers, 245 enlisted men
- Armament: 2 × quad 40 mm (1.57 in) Bofors guns; 8 × single 20 mm (0.79 in) Oerlikon cannons

USS Alecto (AGP-14) was a Portunus-class motor torpedo boat tender built for the United States Navy during World War II. She was originally ordered as USS LST-977 an LST-542-class tank landing ship, but renamed and re-designated on 12 June 1944.

== Construction ==
Alecto was laid down on 12 December 1944, at Hingham, Massachusetts, by the Bethlehem-Hingham Shipyard; launched on 15 January 1945; acquired by the Navy and placed in commission on 8 February 1945, for movement to Baltimore, decommissioned there on 23 February 1945, for conversion by the Maryland Drydock Co. to a motor torpedo boat tender; and recommissioned on 28 July 1945.

== Service history ==
The tender got underway on 6 August, for shakedown training in the Chesapeake Bay and, on 2 September, was assigned to Service Forces, Atlantic Fleet. Following a period of training and upkeep at Norfolk, Virginia, she sailed for Albany, New York, on 14 October, and arrived there two days later.

Alecto moored at the Army Supply Depot at Albany and began servicing motor torpedo boats. On 10 November, the ship moved to Melville, Rhode Island, and engaged in repair work for Motor Torpedo Boat Squadron (MTBRon) 4. In January 1946, she made two voyages from Melville to Solomons Island, Maryland, transporting equipment for MTBRon 4 and, from March through May, she was stationed there. She sailed to Charleston, South Carolina, in early June, and was placed out of commission there on 28 June 1946. Her name was struck from the Navy list on 28 June 1947. The vessel was transferred to the government of Turkey on 10 May 1948, and was later renamed Onaran (A581).

== Bibliography ==
Online resources

- "Alecto". Dictionary of American Naval Fighting Ships. Naval History and Heritage Command. 9 July 2015. This article incorporates text from this source, which is in the public domain.
- "Bethlehem-Hingham, Hingham MA". www.ShipbuildingHistory.com. 11 August 2011.
- "USS Alecto (AGP-14)". NavSource. 24 March 2017.
