= HMS Amsterdam =

Two ships of the Royal Navy have borne the name HMS Amsterdam, after the city of Amsterdam:

- HMS Amsterdam (1804) was the Dutch frigate Proserpine, launched in 1801, that the British captured in 1804 when they captured Suriname. She was sold in 1815.
- HMS Amsterdam (1914) was a merchant vessel launched in 1894 and taken into service in 1914 as an armed boarding steamer. She was returned in September 1919.

== See also ==
SS Amsterdam
