= USS Assurance (MSO-521) =

Minesweeper of the United States Navy

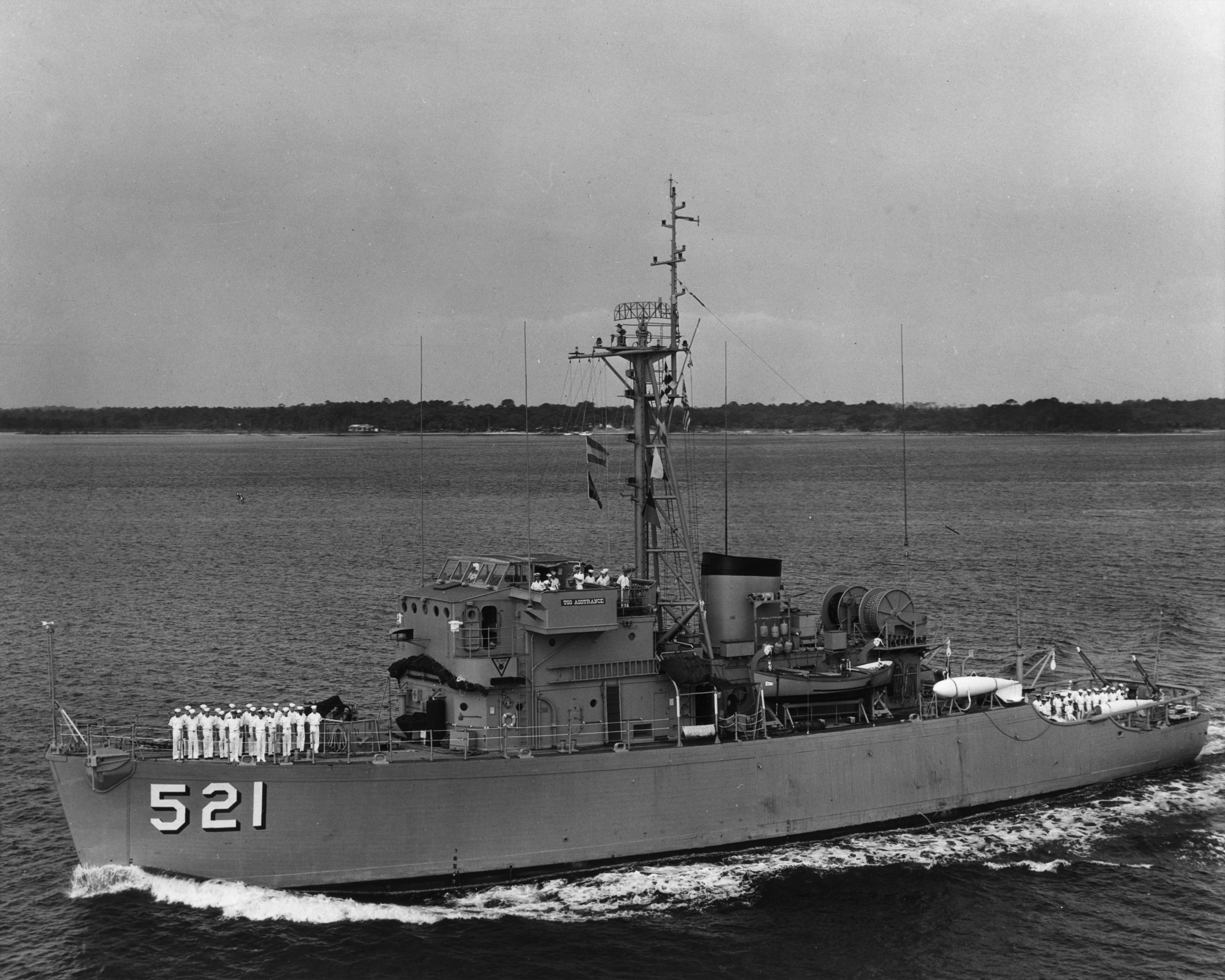

History

United States
- Name: USS Assurance
- Operator: United States Navy
- Laid down: 28 January 1957
- Launched: 31 August 1957
- Sponsored by: Mrs. Vernon W. Thomson
- Commissioned: 21 November 1958
- Decommissioned: 30 September 1977
- Reclassified: MSO-510 to AG-521
- Stricken: 30 September 1977
- Home port: Charleston, South Carolina; Panama City, Florida; Charleston, South Carolina
- Fate: Sold for scrapping, 1979

General characteristics
- Displacement: 934 tons
- Length: 190 ft (58 m)
- Beam: 36 ft (11 m)
- Draught: 12 ft (3.7 m)
- Speed: 15 knots
- Complement: 83
- Armament: one 40 mm mount, two .50 cal (12.7 mm) machine guns

USS Assurance (AM-521/MSO-521) was an Ability-class minesweeper acquired by the U.S. Navy for the task of removing mines that had been placed in the water to prevent the safe passage of ships.

The first ship to be named Assurance by the Navy, MSO-521 was laid down on 28 January 1957 at Sturgeon Bay, Wisconsin, by Peterson Builders, Inc.; launched on 31 August 1957; sponsored by Mrs. Vernon W. Thomson; and commissioned at Boston, Massachusetts, on 21 November 1958.

== East Coast operations ==
The new, nonmagnetic, ocean minesweeper was assigned to Mine Force, Atlantic Fleet, as a member of Mine Division (MinDiv) 45, with Charleston, South Carolina, her home port. While taking part in numerous minesweeping exercises, she visited ports along the U.S. East Coast, on the Gulf of Mexico and in the Caribbean into the following summer.

== First Mediterranean cruise ==
On 1 July 1959, Assurance was transferred to MinDiv 81; and her home port was changed to Panama City, Florida. Her primary mission then changed to service as a test platform for the Mine Defense Laboratory located there. She operated in the Panama City area until 9 February 1962, when she sailed for the Mediterranean and visited ports in Sicily, Greece, Crete, Italy, Spain, and France. She carried out several minesweeping operations before getting underway on 6 August to return to Panama City. Upon her arrival home on 24 August, the minesweeper resumed her schedule of local operations.

Late in 1963, the ship varied this routine with a deployment to the Caribbean. While in the West Indies, she took part in amphibious landing exercises off Vieques, Puerto Rico. She returned to Panama City in February 1964 and resumed her service with the Mine Defense Laboratory. In May, she got underway to sail via Key West, Florida, to Charleston, South Carolina, for repairs in drydock. She returned to Panama City in June.

== Another tour of duty in the Mediterranean ==
After three months of service and a short tender availability, Assurance sailed on 1 October with MinDiv 81 for a tour in the Mediterranean. She took part in Operation "Steel Pike II," then put into Málaga, Spain, before moving to Naples, Italy. The minesweeper sortied with Task Force 61 for operations at Aranci Bay, Sardinia. After stops in Toulon, France, and Santa Manza, Corsica, Assurance proceeded to Sanremo, Italy, for the Christmas holidays.

== Participating in NATO North Atlantic operations ==
During the first two months of 1965, the minesweeper took part in various NATO exercises. Upon her return to Panama City in March, she resumed work for the Mine Defense Laboratory before entering the Charleston Naval Shipyard in July for an overhaul. In September, she returned briefly to Panama City and then sailed in early October for Port Arthur, Texas. The ship resumed her duties at Panama City on 21 October.

== 1966 tender availability and Mediterranean operations ==
Assurance began 1966 with a tender availability alongside USS Pandemus. On 7 March, she sailed for refresher training at Guantánamo Bay, Cuba, and visited Montego Bay, Jamaica, before returning to Panama City on 6 April. The next one and one-half months were spent preparing for overseas deployment. On 12 June, Assurance got underway and joined other units of MinDiv 81 at Valencia, Spain, on 2 July. She shifted to La Spezia, Italy, on the 16th and took part in an exercise with minesweeping craft of the Italian Navy. On 8 August, she participated in "Phiblex 1–66", held south of Porto Scudo, Sardinia. On the 18, the ship headed for Malta. En route, she was diverted to conduct a special surveillance mission off the coast of Tunisia. Having completed this task, Assurance arrived at Valletta, Malta, on 25 August. She also visited Piraeus, Greece; Naples and Rota, Spain, before sailing on 21 September for the United States. The vessel spent the remainder of the year in a leave and upkeep status at Panama City.

Assurance sailed to Charleston, South Carolina, on 11 January 1967 for interim overhaul and returned to her home port on 11 March to commence type training. She sailed back to Charleston on 5 July to provide services to the naval mine warfare school and then briefly visited Panama City before returning to Charleston for overhaul. This yard period ended on 15 December, enabling the minesweeper to return to Florida on 19 December.

The first three months of 1968 found the ship conducting refresher training. She returned to Panama City in April and worked with the Mine Defense Laboratory. In October, Assurance was at Pensacola, Florida, for a restricted availability before finishing the year in port at Panama City.

== 1969 Mediterranean operations ==
The minesweeper got underway for the Mediterranean on 11 January 1969 and, following stops at Bermuda and the Azores, arrived at Gibraltar on 4 February. Visits to Valletta, Malta, and Athens, Greece, preceded the minesweeper's participation in an amphibious exercise near Nafplion, Greece. Assurance then conducted surveillance operations south of Crete and visited La Spezia in March. Combined NATO amphibious operations occupied the month of April. The ship left Rota, Spain, on 26 May, to sail back to the United States. After her arrival in Panama City on 16 June, she spent the next four months in local operations and, on 13 November 1969, commenced an overhaul at Charleston that lasted until early April 1970. Between April and September 1970, Assurance conducted refresher and type training along the eastern seaboard. Late in September, she arrived in Charleston to begin preparations for inactivation. After 10 weeks in Charleston, however, the minesweeper learned that the order for her decommissioning had been reversed. In mid-December 1970, her home port assignment was changed from Panama City, Florida, to Charleston.

== 1971 deactivation cancelled, reactivation started ==
The new year 1971 found Assurance involved in the reactivation process. On 1 April, she became a member of Mine Division 21, Mine Flotilla 2. On 26 April, the minesweeper got underway for refresher training; but, that same day, she suffered a major engine casualty and was forced to return to port for repairs which lasted three months. The ship got underway again on 2 August, successfully completed all phases of her training by 5 October, and rejoined the U.S. Atlantic Fleet. Assurance took part in MINEX 1–71 from 15 to 22 October and then sailed to Mayport, Florida, for interim drydocking. The minesweeper returned to Charleston on 19 November and soon thereafter took part in an air mine countermeasures operation. On 14 December, she was back at Charleston for a leave and upkeep period.

== Supporting Apollo 17 ==
Assurance spent most of 1972 operating in the Charleston area. She provided services to the Fleet Mine Warfare Training Center at Charleston and conducted minesweeping exercises before sailing to Florida's Cape Kennedy, to support the launching of the Apollo 17 space shot. The vessel returned to Charleston on 8 December and finished the year undergoing upkeep.

== Redesignated Miscellaneous Auxiliary AG-521 ==
Assurance was redesignated AG-521 on 1 March 1973. On the 23d, she sailed to Fort George Island, Florida, for overhaul by the Atlantic Drydock Corp. During this work, her minesweeping gear was removed. Assurance was back in Charleston on 1 June to commence a restricted availability. She got underway on 8 October, bound for Norfolk, Virginia, and refresher training. From 19 to 27 November, Assurance was off Port Everglades, Florida, for tests. The ship closed the year in port at Charleston.

== 1974 Mediterranean Sixth Fleet exercises ==
On 7 January 1974, Assurance got underway at Nassau for New Providence. The ship remained in the Bahamas until late in January when she returned to her home port. The period from 25 February to 5 May was spent in a restricted availability at Charleston. Then fleet exercises and a midshipman training cruise occupied Assurance until 16 July, when the ship began a transatlantic voyage to join the U.S. 6th Fleet in the Mediterranean. Following brief stops at Bermuda and Ponta Delgada, the minesweeper arrived at Rota, Spain, on 8 August. For the next three and one-half months, she participated in numerous exercises and visited Palma, Mallorca; Naples, Italy, and Brindisi, Italy; and Barcelona, Spain. On 3 December, she reversed her course and headed back to Charleston. She arrived there on 20 December.

== 1975 Caribbean operations ==
For the first four and one-half months of 1975, the ship operated in the Caribbean. On 10 May, she returned to Charleston and prepared for an overhaul. On 16 June, she entered the Detyen's Shipyard, Wando, South Carolina. Her overhaul was finished on 11 November; and, on 3 December, Assurance got underway for Guantánamo Bay, Cuba, and refresher training. She returned to Charleston on 23 December for holiday leave and upkeep.

The minesweeper began 1976 in upkeep at Charleston and operated in the Jacksonville, Florida, area from 13 to 26 March. She conducted special operations in the western Atlantic Ocean from 15 April through 14 June and, after a brief visit to Halifax, Nova Scotia, returned to Charleston. On 26 July, Assurance got underway for two weeks of operations in the Virginia Capes area, followed by a week of repair work on her engines at Little Creek, Virginia. On 20 August, Assurance arrived back at Charleston and remained there for the duration of the year.

== 1977 final operations ==
On 10 January 1977, the ship entered drydock at Mayport, Florida. She cleared the keelblocks on 7 March, and took part in Operation Cleansweep from the 11th to the 20th. She returned briefly to Charleston before deploying on 11 April for special operations in the Caribbean and western Atlantic.

== Decommissioning ==
Upon her return to Charleston on 24 June, the minesweeper commenced pre-inactivation procedures. Assurance was decommissioned at Charleston on 30 September 1977, and her name was struck from the Navy list simultaneously. In December 1979, the former minesweeper was sold to the Ampol Corp. for scrapping.
