= HMS Alarm (1810) =

History

United Kingdom
- Name: HMS Alarm
- Acquired: 1810 by transfer
- Fate: Returned to Customs 1812 or 1813

General characteristics
- Tons burthen: 15146/94 (bm)
- Length: 71 ft 9 in (21.9 m) (overall); 60 ft 8 in (18.5 m)
- Beam: 21 ft 8 in (6.6 m)
- Depth of hold: 9 ft 3 in (2.8 m)
- Sail plan: Lugger
- Complement: 40
- Armament: 8 × 12-pounder carronades

Alarm was a lugger that the British Royal Navy acquired from the Commissioners of Customs in 1810. She made one small capture before the Navy returned her to Customs in 1812.

In 1811 Lieutenant Robert Forbes was appointed to command Alarm at Leith. On 25 June he captured the Danish sloop Emanuel, Svend Torgenson, master. He brought her into Leith on 1 July.

Alarm was returned to Customs in 1812.

NB: The National Maritime Museum database refers to Alarm as a hired lugger, and gives a service period of 1810–1813.
