= HMS Astute =

Two submarines of the Royal Navy have been named HMS Astute for the characteristic of shrewdness and discernment.

- HMS Astute (P447), launched in 1945, was an Amphion-class submarine. She served in World War II but never saw action against an enemy. She was scrapped in 1970.
- HMS Astute (S119), laid down in 2001 and launched in 2007, is the lead boat of the Astute class of nuclear-powered attack submarines. She was commissioned into the Royal Navy in 2010.
