= HMS Asphodel =

Two ships of the Royal Navy have been named HMS Asphodel :

- HMS Asphodel (1915) an Arabis-class sloop launched in 1915 and sold to the Royal Danish Navy in 1920 who renamed her Fylla
- HMS Asphodel (K56), a Flower-class corvette launched in 1940 and lost in 1944
