= Adder Technology =

British computer hardware accessory company

- Formerly: Adder Publishing
- Type: Private company
- Founded: 1984; 42 years ago
- Headquarters: Cambridge, United Kingdom
- Products: KVM switches, Serial Consoles, IT infrastructure products
- Number of employees: 250 (2021)
- Website: adder.com

Adder Technology is a British manufacturer of keyboard, video, mouse (KVM) hardware based in Cambridge, England, UK. Founded in 1984 by Adrian Dickens, the company specializes in the manufacture of IP based KVM. It is among the leading producers of KVM in Europe.

The company has US, UK, Germany, Netherlands, and Singapore offices and a global distribution network. Some 60% of its production is exported to Europe and the United States.

== History ==
The company was founded in 1984 as Adder Publishing by Adrian Dickens and was rebranded as Adder Technology in 1986. It relocated to Bar Hill in 2012.

Adder initially developed connectivity solutions before specialising in KVM technologies, expanding internationally and establishing a global distribution network spanning more than 60 countries.

Over the following decades, Adder developed a portfolio of KVM switches, extenders and IP-based solutions used in mission-critical environments including broadcast, post-production, industrial control rooms, transport and medical imaging.

In November 2025, the company transitioned to an Employee-Ownership Trust (EOT), transferring a majority shareholding into a trust for the benefit of employees.[8] The move was intended to support long-term independence and align ownership with employees.

In February 2026, Adder opened a Customer Experience Center (CXC) at its global headquarters in Cambridge, designed to provide an environment for customers to evaluate and validate complex connectivity solutions.

== Products ==
Adder develops KVM switches, extenders and IP-based solutions that enable the real-time control and management of local and distributed IT systems. Its product portfolio includes the ADDERLink® and ADDERView® ranges, as well as secure KVM and matrix switching solutions. Other products include KVM switches (analog and Cat5), KVM over IP, digital signage products, remote office/branch office solutions and out-of-band management solutions.

== Recognition ==
Adder Technology has won Deloitte Touche Tohmatsu's "Fast 50" designation in the Deloitte Fast 500 awards for 8 consecutive years. The company has received a Queen's Award for Enterprise.

Additionally, in recent years Adder products have gained recognition through a number of industry awards.

Recent Awards
Year	Award	Product
2023	IBC Best of Show Award	ADDERLink INFINITY 3000 Series
2024	IBC Best of Show Award	ADDERLink INFINITY 1100 Series
2025	ISE Best of Show Award	ARDx
2025	NAB Show Best of Show Award	ADDERView Matrix Range
2025	IBC Best of Show Award	Adder API for ADDERView Matrix
2026	NAB Show Best of Show Award	Adder API for ADDERView Matrix
2026	IBC Best of Show Award	AIM matrix management software

== Employee Ownership ==
Adder Technology operates as a privately held company and, since 2025, is majority-owned by an Employee-Ownership Trust (EOT). Under this model, shares are held in trust on behalf of employees, with the aim of supporting long-term decision-making and organizational stability.
