= HMS Achates =

Five ships of the Royal Navy have been named HMS Achates after Achates, a character in Roman mythology. A sixth was planned but never completed:

- HMS Achates (1573) was a 13-gun ship launched in 1573, hulked in 1590 and sold in 1605.
- HMS Achates (1808) was a 10-gun Cherokee-class brig-sloop launched in 1808 and wrecked in 1810 off Guadeloupe.
- HMS Achates (1809) was a 16-gun brig-sloop, originally the French Milan, launched in 1807, that HMS Surveillante captured on 30 October 1809, and that was sold in 1818.
- HMS Achates (1912) was an Acasta-class destroyer launched in 1912 and sold in 1921.
- HMS Achates (H12) was an A-class destroyer launched in 1929 and sunk in 1942 by the German cruiser Admiral Hipper.
- HMS Achates (P433) was to have been an Amphion-class submarine. She was launched in 1945, but was never completed, and was sunk as a target in 1950.
