= HMS Azalea =

Two ships of the Royal Navy have been named HMS Azalea :

- HMS Azalea (1915) an Azalea-class sloop launched in 1915 and sold in 1923
- HMS Azalea (K25), a Flower-class corvette launched in 1940 and sold in 1946
