= Countess of Anglesey =

Countess of Anglesey is a title normally given to the wife of the Earl of Anglesey. Women who have held the title include:

- Elizabeth Annesley, Countess of Anglesey (1620–1698)
- Elizabeth Annesley, Countess of Anglesey (died 1700)
- Lady Catherine Darnley (c.1681–1743), later Catherine Sheffield, Duchess of Buckingham and Normanby
- Henrietta Stanley, 4th Baroness Strange (1687–1714)
- Juliana Annesley, Countess of Anglesey (died 1777)
