= HMS Anemone =

Two ships of the Royal Navy have been named HMS Anemone:

- HMS Anemone (1915) was an Acacia-class sloop launched in 1915 and sold in 1922
- HMS Anemone (K48) was a Flower-class corvette, launched in 1940 and sold in 1949
