= HMS Arachne =

Two ships of the Royal Navy have borne the name HMS Arachne:

- HMS Arachne (1809), a Cruizer-class brig-sloop launched in 1809 and sold in 1837
- HMS Arachne (1847), a sloop launched in 1847 and broken up in 1866
