= Antrim 20 =

Sailboat class

Development
- Designer: Jim Antrim
- Location: United States
- Year: 1982
- Builder: Antrim Marine
- Role: Cruiser
- Name: Antrim 20

Boat
- Displacement: 1,850 lb (839 kg)
- Draft: 4.00 ft (1.22 m)

Hull
- Type: monohull
- Construction: fiberglass
- LOA: 20.42 ft (6.22 m)
- LWL: 17.50 ft (5.33 m)
- Beam: 8.00 ft (2.44 m)
- Engine: outboard motor

Hull appendages
- Keel: fin keel
- Ballast: 750 lb (340 kg)
- Rudder: transom-mounted rudder

Rig
- Rig type: Bermuda rig
- I foretriangle height: 24.00 ft (7.32 m)
- J foretriangle base: 7.75 ft (2.36 m)
- P mainsail luff: 26.50 ft (8.08 m)
- E mainsail foot: 10.00 ft (3.05 m)

Sails
- Sailplan: fractional rigged sloop
- Mainsail area: 132.50 sq ft (12.310 m^{2})
- Jib/genoa area: 93.00 sq ft (8.640 m^{2})
- Total sail area: 225.50 sq ft (20.950 m^{2})

The Antrim 20 is a recreational keelboat that was designed by Jim Antrim as a cruiser and first built in 1982.

== Production ==
The design was built by Antrim Marine in the United States, starting in 1982, but it is now out of production. Henkel reports that it was not in production long and only a small number were built, while McArthur reports, "if any were ever built is unknown".

== Design ==
The designer's goals for this boat were to create, "the smallest boat with a workable interior, attractive appearance and eight-foot trailerable beam, and to provide the performance and feeling of spaciousness one might expect in a larger boat."

The Antrim 20 is built predominantly of fiberglass. It has a fractional sloop rig, a raked stem, a plumb transom, a transom-hung rudder controlled by a tiller and a fixed fin keel. It displaces 1,850 lb (839 kg) and carries 750 lb (340 kg) of ballast.

The boat has a draft of 4.00 ft (1.22 m) with the standard keel and is normally fitted with a small 2 to 5 hp (1 to 4 kW) outboard motor for docking and maneuvering.

The design has sleeping accommodation for four people, with a double "V"-berth in the bow cabin and two quarter berths in the main cabin, under the cockpit. The galley is located just aft of the bow cabin. The galley gas a pull-out stove located in a drawer on the port side and a sink on the starboard side. A portable icebox fits under the companionway steps. The head is a portable type, located under the bow cabin "V"-berth. Cabin headroom is 52 in (130 cm).

The design has a hull speed of 5.6 kn (10.4 km/h).

== Operational history ==
In a 2010 review, Steve Henkel wrote that the boat is, "probably the best sailer in light and medium air in her [size], combining a deep fin, big sail area and SA/D ratio, and broad waterplane aft ... The same factors that make her a good sailer, particularly in light air, also work against her to some extent in heavy air. She needs a big crew to keep her on her feet in a blow, or if short-handed, she needs to be reefed early. Being deep draft, she is relatively difficult to trailer and launch. Still, overall, we like this design a lot, and are sorry that she was produced for such a short time."

In a July 1981 review, in Cruising World, the design was described as setting future trends. "With its short overhangs, shallow hull and beam carried well aft, the Antrim 20 resembles a large dinghy with a keel. The enormous rig, reinforces this impression. Sailing performance should be nothing short of exciting ... This is a handsome, exciting little cruiser which should be relatively inexpensive to buy and maintain. This may be the shape of things to come."

== See also ==
- List of sailing boat types
