= HMS Aigle =

Two ships of the Royal Navy have borne the name HMS Aigle, after the French for Eagle:

- HMS Aigle was a French frigate launched in 1780 that the French navy purchased in 1782 and that the British captured that same year. The British took her into the Royal Navy as a 38-gun fifth rate under her existing name. She wrecked in 1798 on Plane Island (Île Plane) (37°10′54″N 10°19′40″E) off Cape Farina, Tunisia, due to an error in navigation. All the crew were saved.
- HMS Aigle (1801) was a 36-gun fifth rate launched in 1801. She was used as a coal hulk from 1853, sunk in shallow water during torpedo experiments, and was sold in 1870 for breaking up.

== See also ==
- HMS Eagle
- French ship Aigle
