= RMS Alcantara =

RMS Alcantara can refer to either of two ocean liners which were used by the British Royal Navy (RN) in wartime, adopting the prefix "HMS" while in RN service:

- RMS Alcantara (1913) - launched in 1913 and sunk in combat during World War I with SMS Greif in 1916.
- RMS Alcantara (1926) - launched in 1926 and served as an armed merchant cruiser and troopship during World War II. Scrapped in 1958.

== See also ==
- Alcantara (disambiguation)
