= HMAS Albatross =

One ship and one shore base of the Royal Australian Navy (RAN) have borne the name HMAS Albatross, for the albatross:

- HMAS Albatross (1928), a seaplane carrier launched in 1928, which left service in 1933 and was transferred to the Royal Navy in 1938
- HMAS Albatross (air station), a naval aviation base at Nowra, New South Wales, which was opened in 1948 and is active as of 2016

== See also ==
- HMS Albatross - seven units of the Royal Navy
