= HMS Acute =

Three ships of the Royal Navy have borne the name HMS Acute:

- HMS Acute (1797) was a 12-gun gunboat launched in 1797 and sold in 1802.
- HMS Acute (1804) was a 12-gun gun-brig launched in 1804. She was reduced to harbour service in 1813 and was transferred to the Coastguard in 1831.
- HMS Acute (J106) was an Algerine-class minesweeper ordered as HMS Alert but renamed in 1941 and launched in 1942. She was expended as a target in 1964.

== See also ==
- HMAS Acute
