= HMS Astraea =

Six ships of the Royal Navy have borne the name HMS Astraea, HMS Astree or HMS Astrea, after the ancient Greek goddess Astraea from Greek mythology and ancient religion:

- HMS Astraea (1739) was a storeship, formerly a Spanish ship captured in 1739. She was burnt by accident in 1743.
- HMS Astraea (1781) was a 32-gun fifth rate launched in 1781 and wrecked on the Anegada Reefs in the Virgin Islands in 1808.
- HMS Astraea (1810) was a 36-gun fifth rate launched in 1810, on harbour service from 1823 and broken up in 1851.
- HMS Astree (1810) was a 38-gun fifth rate, formerly a French ship captured in 1810. She was renamed HMS Pomone in 1811 and was broken up in 1816.
- HMS Astrea was a wooden screw frigate ordered in 1861, but canceled in 1863.
- HMS Astraea (1893) was an Astraea-class cruiser launched in 1893 and sold in 1920. She was then resold and finally broken up in Germany.

== Battle honours ==
Ships named Astraea have earned the following battle honours:

- Groix Island, 1795
- Gloire, 1795
- St Lucia, 1796
- Egypt, 1801
- Tamatave, 1811
- Cameroons, 1914

== See also ==
- French ship Astrée
