= HMS Alban (1813) =

History

United States
- Name: William Bayard
- Owner: Allyn Mather, Roy Bayard, William Bayard, M.Sims, & Enoch Conklin
- Builder: Bergh, New York
- Launched: 1812
- Captured: 12 March 1813

United Kingdom
- Name: HMS Alban
- Acquired: By capture 1813
- Commissioned: October 1813
- Fate: Broken up 18 February 1822

General characteristics
- Tons burthen: 241, or 25275/94 (bm)
- Length: Overall:94 ft 4 1/2 in (28.8 m); Keel:78 ft 6 1/2 in (23.9 m)
- Beam: 24 ft 7 1/8 in (7.5 m)
- Depth of hold: 10 ft 6 in (3.2 m)
- Sail plan: Schooner
- Complement: Letter of Marque:31; Royal Navy:60
- Armament: Letter of Marque: 4 guns; Royal Navy: 2 × 6-pounder guns + 12 × 12-pounder carronades

HMS Alban was the American letter of marque William Bayard, launched in New York in 1812, that the British Royal Navy captured in 1813 and took into service. She had an unexceptional career and was broken up in 1822.

== American schooner ==
Captain Allyn Mather acquired a letter of marque on 30 January 1813. The British warships HMS Warspite and Pheasant captured William Bayard on 13 March 1813.

== Royal Navy ==
The Royal Navy commissioned William Bayard as HMS Alban in October 1813 under Lieutenant Mayson Wright. Wright was promoted to Commander on 7 October, and Alban was re-rated as a sloop to be commensurate with Wright's promotion.

On 2 September 1814 Alban recaptured the brig Favorite, of 158 tons (bm). Favorite had been sailing from Calcutta to Port Jackson when the American privateer Hyder Ali had captured Favorite on 27 April 1814 in the eastern Indian Ocean. Her master's name was given as W.Mayton, and her cargo consisted of tea, sugar, rice, and piece goods. (By another report, Hyder Ali had captured Favorite on 9 May.

On 10 September Alban captured Betsey. Betey, Hiram Geyar, master, had been sailing from Boston to Machias with a cargo of flour and provisions.

In January 1815 Commander David Boyd replaced Mayson. Commander Hugh Payson replaced Boyd in 1816. Alban was paid off in October 1818. In November Lieutenant Robert Gibson took command and remained in command until 1820.

== Fate ==
Alban was broken on 18 February 1822.
