= HMS Attentive =

Four ships and one shore establishment of the Royal Navy have borne the name HMS Attentive:

- HMS Attentive (1804) was an Archer-class gunbrig of 12 guns, launched in 1804 and broken up in 1812.
- HMS Attentive was the American brig Magnet captured in 1812 that the Royal Navy took into service as HMS Magnet, used as prison ship at Halifax, Nova Scotia during the War of 1812, and then renamed HMS Attentive c. 1814. Attentive served as a store ship until she was broken up in Britain in 1817.
- HMS Attentive (1904) was an Adventure-class scout cruiser of the Royal Navy launched in 1904 and sold for scrapping in 1920.
- HMS Attentive II was the shore base for the Dover Patrol, and was established in 1914 and decommissioned 31 October 1919.
- HMS Adder (1905) was a tender transferred from the War Department in 1905. She was renamed HMS Attentive in 1919, and was sold in 1923.

On 1 September 1939, the designation HMS Attentive was allocated for a base at the commercial port of Portland, but it subsequently remained unused.
