= HMS Aid =

Two ships of the Royal Navy have borne the name HMS Aid:

- Aid (1562) was an 18-gun ship launched in 1562, rebuilt in 1580 and broken up in 1599.
- HMS Aid (1809) was a 10-gun transport launched in 1809. She was used as a survey ship from 1817, was renamed HMS Adventure in 1821 and was sold in 1853.
