= HMS Artful =

Two submarines of the Royal Navy have been named HMS Artful:

- HMS Artful (P456), an Amphion-class submarine launched in 1947.
- HMS Artful (S121), an Astute-class submarine launched in 2014.
