= Alecto (motorcycle) =

Motorcycle brand

Alecto motorcycles were manufactured between 1919 and 1925 in London by Whitmee Engineering. A chain-driven 345cc model was built between 1923 and 1924.
