= HMS Answer =

The following ships of the Royal Navy has borne the name Answer or HMS Answer:

- Answer (1590) was a 21-gun galleon built in 1590, rebuilt in 1604 and sold in 1629.
- HMS Answer (P425) was to have been an Amphion-class submarine, but she was cancelled in 1945.
