= HMS Albany (1745) =

Royal Navy sloop

HMS Albany was a 14-gun sloop launched by Darby of Gosport on 23 March 1745. She measured 270 tons (BM) and was 91 foot long with a breadth of 26 feet. She sailed from Louisbourg, Cape Breton Island on 7 July 1746, for Boston, Province of Massachusetts Bay, but was captured en route on 19 July by the French frigate Castor in Chedabucto Bay, Nova Scotia. Albany was completely dismasted by concentrated gunfire on the rigging, with the loss of one British life.

Albany was not renamed by the French, and retired in 1747.
