= HMS Ard Patrick =

Two ships of the Royal Navy have been named HMS Ard Patrick.

- HMS Ard Patrick (1918) was an 24-class minesweeping sloop launched in 1918 and sold on 12 August 1920.
- HMS Ard Patrick (1944) was a requisitioned cargo vessel SS Clan Lamont, commissioned in 1944 and returned to her owners in 1946.
