= HMS Anne =

A number of ships of the English navy or Royal Navy have borne the name Anne or Ann:

- English ship Ann (1416) was a ballinger in service in 1416.
- English ship Ann (1417) was a ballinger in service in 1417.
- HMS Anne (1660) was a 52-gun Speaker-class frigate launched as Bridgewater in 1654, and renamed in 1660. She was accidentally blown up in 1673.
- HMY Anne was a royal yacht built in 1661.
- HMS Anne (1678) was a 70-gun third-rate ship of the line launched in 1678 and burnt after the Battle of Beachy Head in 1690.
- HMS Anne (1702) was a fireship purchased in 1702.
- HMS Anne (1798) was a 14-gun armed ship purchased in 1798 and sold in 1802.
- HMS Anne (1915) was a seaplane carrier, formerly the German merchant Aenne Rickmers. She was seized in 1914 and renamed in 1915. She became a fleet collier in 1918 and was sold in 1919.

== Hired armed vessels ==
- Hired armed brig Ann
- Hired armed cutter Ann

== See also ==
- Ann (ship), a list of ships named Ann or Anne
- HMS Anna
- HMS Ann and Christopher
- HMS Ann and Judith
- English ship Anne Gallant
- English ship Anne Royal
- HMS Anne Galley
