= Leonardus Achates =

Leonardus Achates de Basilea, born Leonhard Agtstein in Basel, was a compositor who worked from 1472 to 1491. He is one of the first to introduce the art of printing books in Italy.

In 1472 he published a folio edition of Virgil in Venice. In the same year, he appears in Vicenza where he seems to have lived most of the time. In the meantime however, editions appeared in Padua and St. Ursus.

== Publications ==
Achates printed books on various subjects, including agriculture, grammar, juristic and theological works. Two of his works are suspected reprints.

- Franciscus de Platea: Opus restitutionum, usurarum, excommunicationum, Padua, 1473 (not after 28 July)
- Omnibonus Leonicenus: De laudibus eloquentiae and Commentum in Ciceronis Oratorem, Vicenza, 22 December 1476, folio
- Pietro de Crescenzi: Ruralia commoda, Vicenza, 1490
- Euclid: Elementa in artem geometriae, reprint, 1491, Vicenza
- Constantine Lascaris: Grammatica graecolatina, Vicenza, 23 December 1491
- Arnoldus de Villa Nova: Tractatus de virtutibus herbarum, Vicenza, 27 October 1491

== Sources ==
- Otto Mühlbrecht (1875). "Achates, Leonardus" . Allgemeine Deutsche Biographie (in German). Vol. 1. Leipzig: Duncker & Humblot. p. 28.
