= Dutch ship Admiraal Tjerk Hiddes De Vries =

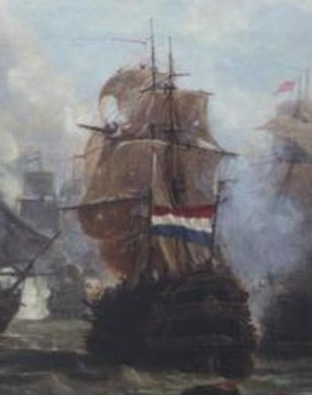
- The ship Admiraal Tjerk Hiddes de Vries during the Battle of Camperdown.

History

Dutch Republic
- Name: Admiraal Tjerk Hiddes de Vries
- Launched: 12 November 1782
- Commissioned: 1783
- Decommissioned: 1795

Batavian Republic
- Name: Admiraal Tjerk Hiddes de Vries
- Commissioned: 1795
- In service: 1795
- Out of service: 1797
- Captured: 11 October 1797
- Fate: Captured

Great Britain
- Name: HMS Admiral de Vries
- Acquired: 1797
- Commissioned: 1797
- Decommissioned: 1806
- Reclassified: Transport ship in 1799; Prison ship from 1802
- Fate: Disposed in 1806

General characteristics in Dutch service
- Class & type: 68-gun Third Charter; ship of the line
- Propulsion: Sails
- Sail plan: Full-rigged ship
- Armament: 68 Guns:

Admiraal Tjerk Hiddes de Vries was a 68-gun ship of the line of the Dutch States Navy. Organisationally part of the Admiralty of Friesland, she was launched in 1782. In 1783 Admiraal Tjerk Hiddes de Vries sailed to the Mediterranean Sea under Captain Van der Beets. When she returned in the Dutch Republic she was laid up in ordinary until 1795.

In 1795, the ship was commissioned in the newly-founded Batavian Navy. On 11 October 1797 she took part in the Battle of Camperdown under Captain J. B. Zeegers, where the vessel was captured by the Royal Navy, which brought her back to England. The ship was commissioned into the British navy and renamed HMS Admiral DeVries, and in 1799 she served as a transport ship. In that year she sailed to the West Indies. Admiral DeVries sprang a leak off Hispaniola and was determined to be unfit for sea. She served as a prison hulk in Port Royal, Jamaica until being sold in 1806.

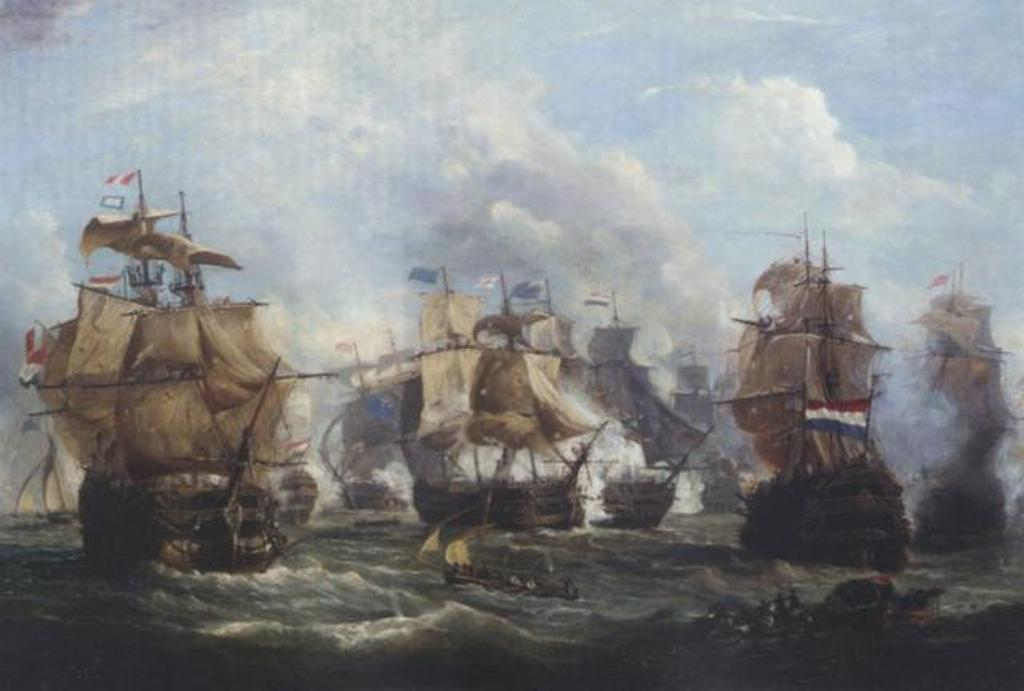
The Battle of Camperdown by Martinus Schouman.
