= HMS Amity =

Five vessels of the Royal Navy have been named HMS Amity:

- HMS Amity (1660) was a 36-gun ship purchased in 1650 and sold in 1667
- HMS Amity (1673) was a 6-gun fireship purchased in 1673 and sunk in the same year as a foundation at Sheerness Dockyard
- HMS Amity (1794) was a 10-gun fireship purchased in 1794 and sold in 1800
- HMS Amitie (1804) was a 14-gun schooner captured from the French in 1804. She was expended as a fireship at the Raid on Boulogne
- HMS Amity (1943) was a Catherine-class minesweeper intended for the Royal Navy but kept by the United States as USS Defense
