= HMS Athenienne =

Three ships of the British Royal Navy have been named HMS Athenienne, or Athenian, or Athenien:

- HMS Athenienne (1796) was a former French privateer that the French Navy took into service in 1796 but that the British captured off Barbados and commissioned later that year before selling her in 1802.
- HMS Athenienne (1800) was a vessel that the Knights of Malta constructed but that the French captured and launched in 1798 as Athénien. The British captured her in 1800 and took her into service as Athenienne. She was wrecked in the Mediterranean with heavy loss of life in October 1806.
- HMT Athenian was a trawler requisitioned for use in World War II

== See also ==
- HMS Athene
