= HMS Ambrose =

Two ships and a shore establishment of the Royal Navy have borne the name HMS Ambrose, after Saint Ambrose:

- HMS Ambrose (1914) was a cargo liner that was commissioned as an armed merchant cruiser, later converted into a depot ship. She was renamed HMS Cochrane in 1938 and was broken up in 1946.
- HMS Ambrose (1939) was the fishing boat Carmania II hired in November 1939 and renamed Ambrose in April 1940. She was returned to her owners in December 1945.
- HMS Ambrose (shore establishment) was the Dundee submarine base during World War II. The Dundee International Submarine Memorial has been built there to commemorate the submariners lost during the war from Dundee.
