= HMS Anthony =

Three ships of the Royal Navy have borne the name HMS Anthony:

- HMS Anthony (1417), built in 1417
- HMS Anthony (1588), in service between 1588 and 1599
- HMS Anthony (H40), an A-class destroyer launched in 1929 and scrapped in 1948

== See also ==
- HMS Anthony Bonaventure
