= HMS Asp =

Five vessels of Britain's Royal Navy have borne the name HMS Asp, named after the Asp, which in antiquity referred to any one of several venomous snake species found in the Nile region.

- HMS Asp (1797) was an Acute-class gunbrig (ex-GB No.5), disposed of in 1803.
- HMS Asp (1808) was the French Navy's corvette Serpent, under the command of Lieutenant de vaisseau Paul de Lamanon, when HMS Acasta captured her in 1808 off La Guaira, Venezuela. Rear-Admiral the Honourable Sir Alexander Cochrane provisionally named her Pert, but as there was already a brig HMS Pert, the Admiralty named her HMS Asp. The Royal Navy commissioned her as 16-gun sloop and disposed of her in 1814. She then made four voyages as a whaler, and wrecked in December 1828 on the fifth voyage.
- HMS Asp (1826) was a cutter that the Royal Navy purchased in 1826 and sold in 1829.
- HMS Asp (1837) was a paddle steamer packet of 112 tons that the Admiralty acquired from the Post Office in 1837 and disposed of in 1881.
- HMS Asp (1890) was a tug in service 1891-1947
