= ATC code A13 =

Pharmaceutical drug classification

ATC code A13 Tonics is a therapeutic subgroup of the Anatomical Therapeutic Chemical Classification System, a system of alphanumeric codes developed by the World Health Organization (WHO) for the classification of drugs and other medical products. Subgroup A13 is part of the anatomical group A Alimentary tract and metabolism.

Codes for veterinary use (ATCvet codes) can be created by placing the letter Q in front of the human ATC code: for example, QA13.
National versions of the ATC classification may include additional codes not present in this list, which follows the WHO version.

== A13A Tonics ==
This group is empty.
