= HMS Aurora =

Ten ships of the Royal Navy have been called HMS Aurora or HMS Aurore, after the Roman Goddess of the dawn.

- HMS Aurora (1757) was a 36-gun fifth rate, formerly the French Abenakise. She was captured in 1757 and broken up in 1763.
- HMS Aurora (1766) was a 32-gun fifth rate launched in 1766, sailed September 1769 for East Indies, lost without a trace, presumably from fire or storm, in the Indian Ocean in January 1770.
- HMS Aurora (1777) was a 28-gun sixth rate launched in 1777 and sold in 1814.
- HMS Aurore (1793) was a French Navy 32-gun frigate handed over to the British at the capture of Toulon in 1793. She became a prison ship in 1799, and was broken up in 1803.
- HMS Aurora (1814) was a 38-gun fifth rate, originally the French frigate Clorinde. She was captured in 1814 and broken up in 1851.
- HMS Aurora (1861) was a wooden screw frigate launched in 1861 and broken up in 1881.
- HMS Aurora (1887) was an Orlando-class armoured cruiser launched in 1887 and sold in 1907.
- HMS Aurora (1913) was an Arethusa-class light cruiser launched in 1913. She was briefly transferred to the Royal Canadian Navy in 1920 and was broken up in 1927.
- HMS Aurora (12) was an Arethusa-class light cruiser launched in 1936. She was sold to The Republic of China in 1948, was sunk in 1950 and salvaged in 1951, hulked and then scrapped by 1960.
- HMS Aurora (F10) was a Leander-class frigate launched in 1962 and broken up in 1990.

== Battle honours ==
Ships named Aurora have earned the following battle honours:

- St. Lucia 1778
- Minorca 1798
- Guadeloupe 1810
- China 1900
- Dogger Bank 1915
- Bismarck 1941
- Mediterranean 1941–43
- Malta Convoys 1941
- North Africa 1942–43
- Sicily 1943
- Salerno 1943
- Aegean 1943–44
- South France 1944

== See also ==
- HCS Aurora (1809), launched in 1809 for the British East India Company's naval arm, the Bombay Marine; last listed 1828
