= HMS Anchusa =

Two Royal Navy ships have been named HMS Anchusa after the flower:

- HMS Anchusa (1917), an Anchusa-class sloop launched in 1917. It was sunk by SM U-54 off Ireland on 16 July 1918.
- HMS Anchusa (K186), a Flower-class corvette launched at Harland & Wolff on 15 January 1941 and sold in 1946. The new owners renamed her Silverlord.
