= HMS Algiers =

HMS Algiers refers to the following ships of the Royal Navy

- HMS Algiers (1854)
- HMS Triumph (1870), later renamed HMS Algiers

== See also ==
- Algiers (disambiguation)
