= English ship Anne Gallant =

Two ships of the Royal Navy have borne the name Anne Gallant:

- English ship Anne Gallant (1512) was a ship built in 1512 and wrecked in 1518.
- English ship Anne Gallant (1559) was a 50-gun galley last listed in 1559.

== See also ==
- HMS Anne
