= HMS Albion (1798) =

Sloop of the Royal Navy (1798–1803)

History

Great Britain
- Name: Albion
- Launched: 1797, Sunderland
- Fate: Sold 1798

Great Britain
- Name: HMS Albion
- Acquired: April 1798 by purchase
- Commissioned: May 1798
- Fate: Sold 1803

United Kingdom
- Name: Albion
- Acquired: 1803 by purchase
- Fate: Possibly foundered in August 1808

General characteristics
- Tons burthen: 36010/94, or 365 (bm)
- Length: Overall: 93 ft 10 1/2 in (28.6 m); Keel: 76 ft 11 1/8 in (23.4 m)
- Beam: 29 ft 8 in (9.0 m)
- Depth of hold: 13 ft 0 1/2 in (4.0 m)
- Complement: 125
- Armament: Mercantile (1797): 4 × 3-pounder guns; Royal Navy: 20 × 32-pounder carronades; Mercantile (1804): 20 × 18-pounder carronades
- Notes: Although some sources identify this Albion with a Hired armed ship Albion that served the Royal Navy between 1793 and 1794, that Albion had a burthen of 393 tons.

HMS Albion was the mercantile Albion launched at Sunderland in 1797 that the Royal Navy purchased in 1798. The Navy sold her at Sheerness in 1803. She became a transport. It is possible that she foundered in August 1808.

== Career ==
Albion first appeared in Lloyd's Register (LR) in 1797.

Year	Master	Owner	Trade	Source
1797	Tinmouth	W.Robson	Hull–Hamburg	LR

After purchasing Albion in April 1798, the Royal Navy had her fitted at Limehouse and then Deptford.

Commander James Hills commissioned her for the North Sea and the Downs in May 1798. Between 1798 and 1802 she only appeared twice in Lloyd's List's ship arrival and departure data. In both cases Albion was escorting convoys, and the items referred to her as "the armed ship Albion". The Navy sold Albion in 1803.

Albion returned to mercantile service.

Year	Master	Owner	Trade	Source
1802	Robson	W.Robson	Government service	RS
1804	Robson; W.Walker	W.Robson; Hurry & Co.	Government service London transport	RS
1806	W.Walker	Hurry & Co.	London transport	RS

Unfortunately, there are no online copies of the Register of Shipping for 1807 to 1809, and Lloyd's Register did not carry Albion after the Navy had purchased her. It is therefore difficult to track her in news accounts.

On 29 January 1807, Albion transport, Adie, master, arrived at Gibraltar, from Malta. On 24 June she sailed from Portsmouth to the River Plate. On 3 December she arrived at the Cape of Good Hope from Deptford. Then in January 1809, Lloyd's List reported that Albion, Adie, master, had foundered in August 1808 as she was on her way back to London from the Cape. The crew arrived at Rio de Janeiro. She had parted in a gale of wind from a convoy off the Cape Verde Islands. Unfortunately, it will require original research to determine whether the transport Albion, Adie, master, was the Albion launched at Sunderland in 1797.
