= HMS Atalanta =

Eight ships of the Royal Navy have been named HMS Atalanta or HMS Atalante after the athlete in ancient Greek mythology.

- HMS Atalanta (1775) was a 14-gun sloop launched in 1775, renamed HMS Helena in 1801 and sold in 1802.
- HMS Atalante (1797) was a 16-gun brig-sloop captured from the French in 1797 and wrecked in 1807.
- HMS Atalante (1808) (or Atalanta) was an 18-gun sloop launched in 1808 and wrecked in 1813.
- HMS Atalanta (1814) was originally the letter of marque schooner Siro, which HMS Pelican captured in January 1814 and which the Royal Navy registered but sold apparently before she served in the Royal Navy, and which USS Wasp captured in September 1814.
- HMS Atalanta (1816) was a tender launched in 1816 and transferred to the Customs service the following year.
- HMS Atalanta (1847) was a 16-gun brig launched in 1847 and broken up in 1868.
- HMS Atalanta was a 26-gun frigate launched in 1844 as HMS Juno. She was renamed HMS Mariner in January 1878 and then HMS Atalanta two weeks later. She disappeared in January 1879 after leaving Bermuda while serving as a training ship and was presumed to have foundered in a storm. Over the next 18 months multiple pieces of wreckage were found, but could not be proved to be from the Atalanta. Two messages in a bottle were found, but these proved to be hoaxes.
- HMS Atalanta (1915) armed yacht, pennant 020. Originally Lorena, in naval service from 5 June 1915 to 21 February 1919.
