= USS Ardent =

USS Ardent has been the name of more than one United States Navy ship, and may refer to:

- USS Ardent (SP-680), a patrol vessel and minesweeper in commission from 1917 to 1921
- USS Ardent (AM-340), a minesweeper in commission from 1944 to 1947
- USS Ardent (MCM-12), a mine countermeasures ship in commission from 1994 to 2020
