= HMS Acacia =

Two vessels of the British Royal Navy have been named HMS Acacia.

- HMS Acacia (1915), an Acacia-class sloop launched in 1915 and sold in 1922.
- HMS Acacia (T02), a Tree-class trawler launched in 1940 and sold in 1946.
