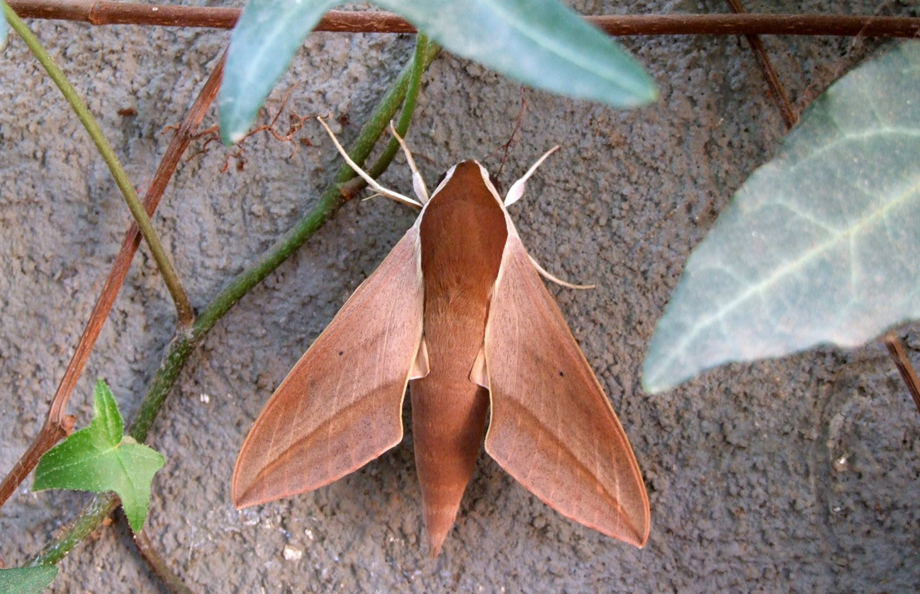

Scientific classification
- Kingdom: Animalia
- Phylum: Arthropoda
- Class: Insecta
- Order: Lepidoptera
- Family: Sphingidae
- Genus: Theretra
- Species: T. alecto

Binomial name
- Theretra alecto (Linnaeus, 1758)

Synonyms
- Sphinx alecto Linnaeus, 1758; Sphinx cretica Boisduval, 1827; Theretra freyeri Kirby, 1892; Theretra alecto intermissa Gehlen, 1941; Theretra alecto transcaspica O. Bang-Haas, 1927

= Theretra alecto =

Levant hawk moth

Species of moth

Theretra alecto, the Levant hawk moth, is a moth of the family Sphingidae. The species was first described by Carl Linnaeus in his 1758 10th edition of Systema Naturae.

== Distribution ==
It is found in the Indomalayan realm and warm parts of the Palearctic realm, including extreme south-eastern Europe.

== Description ==
The wingspan is 75–106 mm.

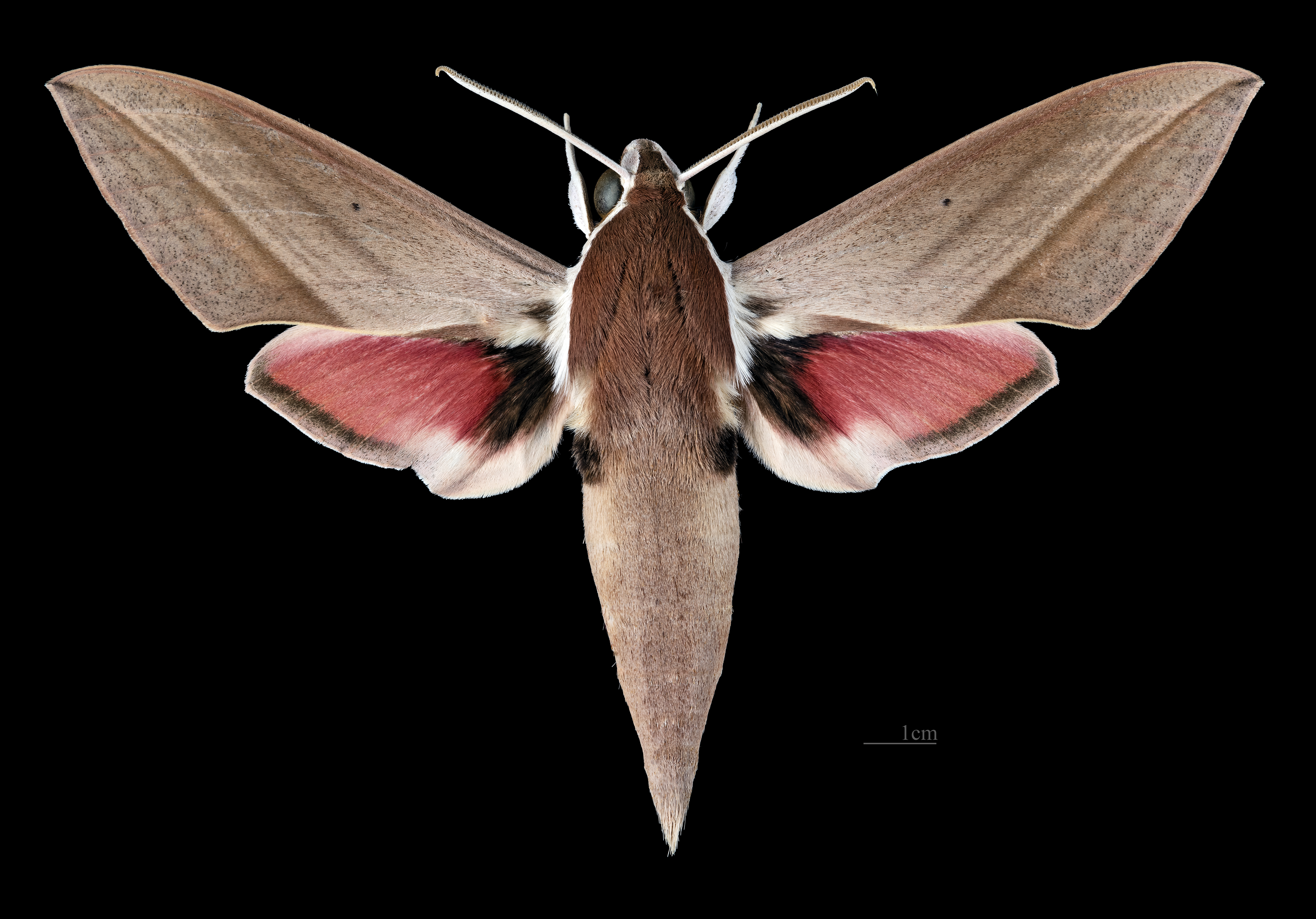
Male

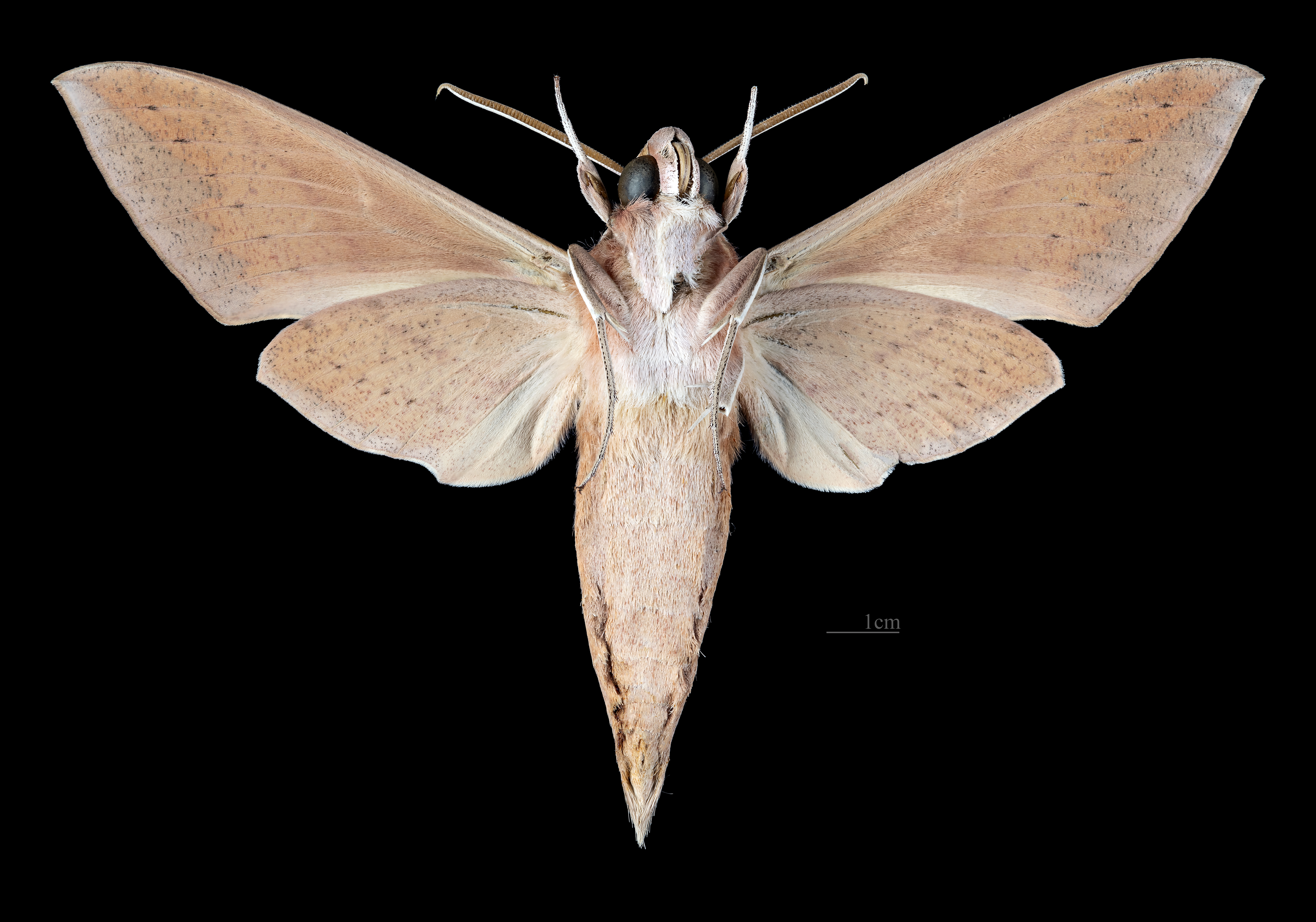
Male ventral view

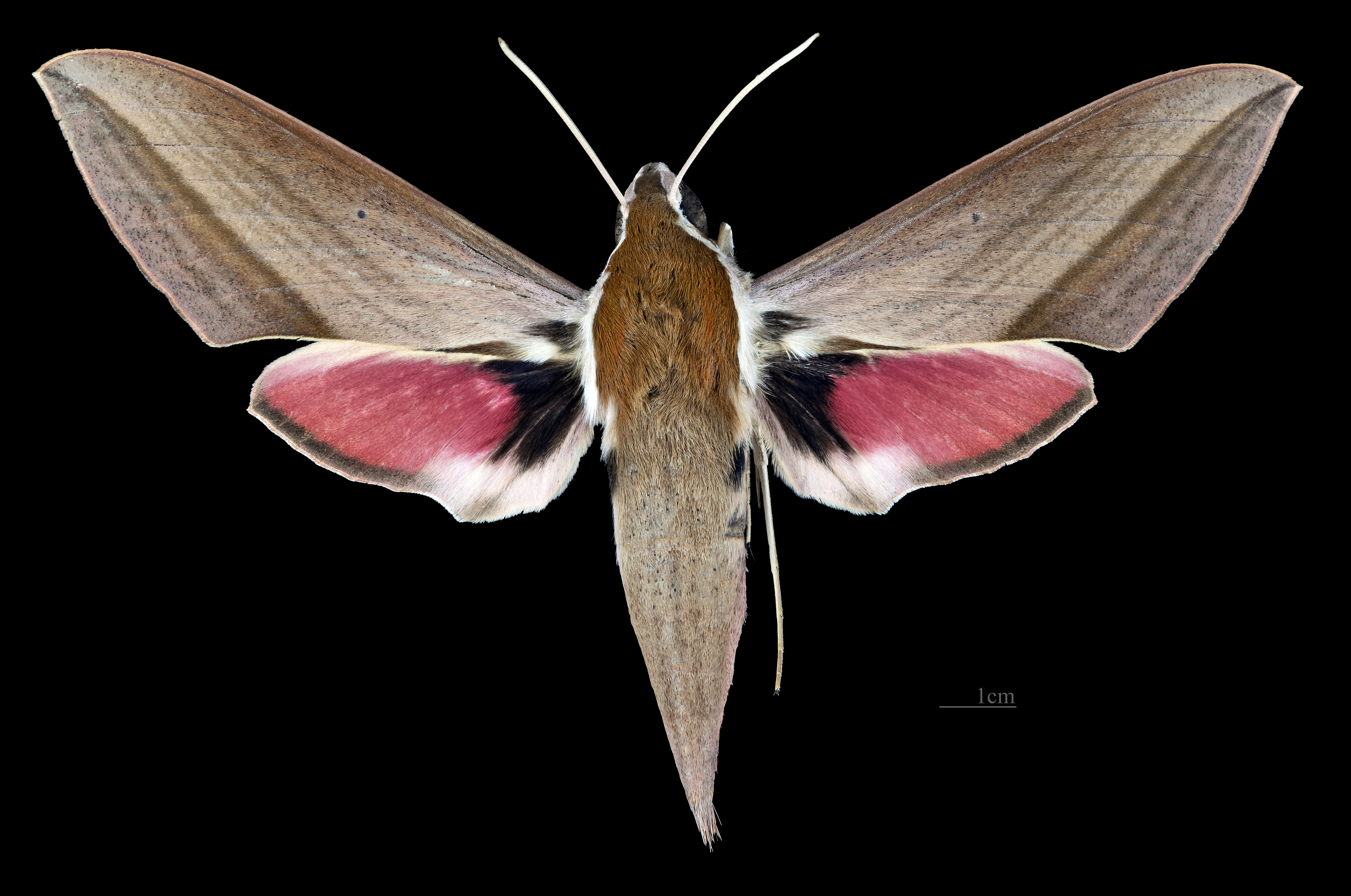
Female

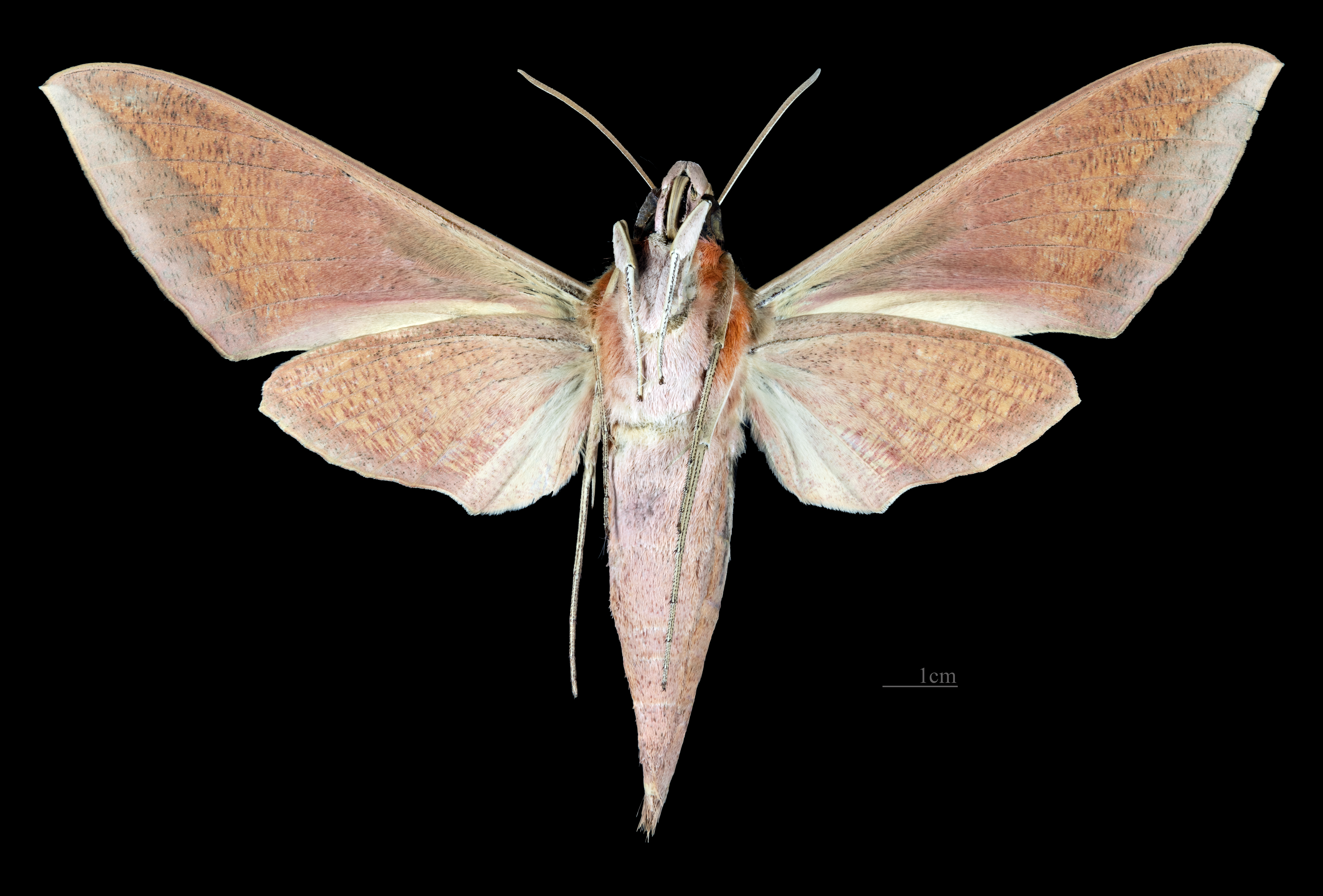
Female ventral view

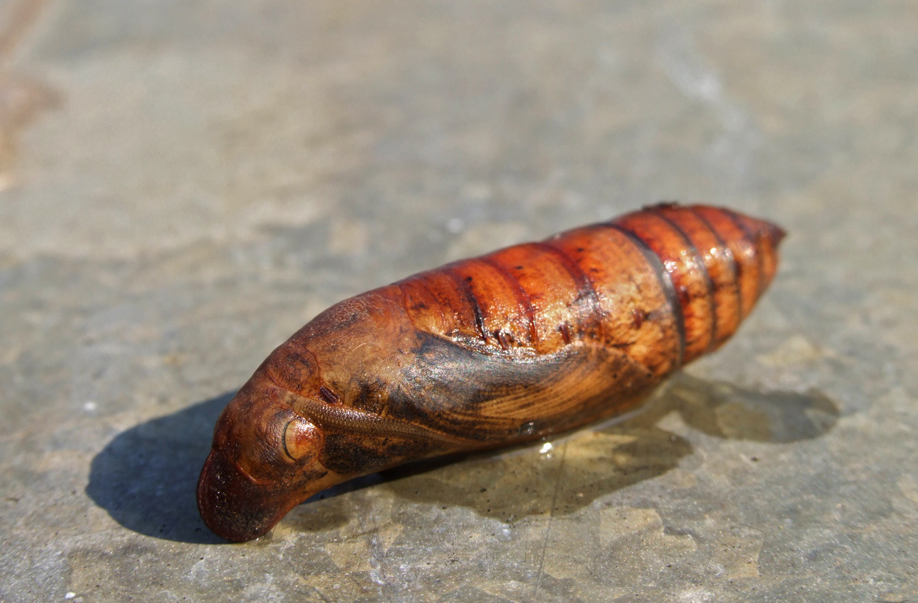
Pupa

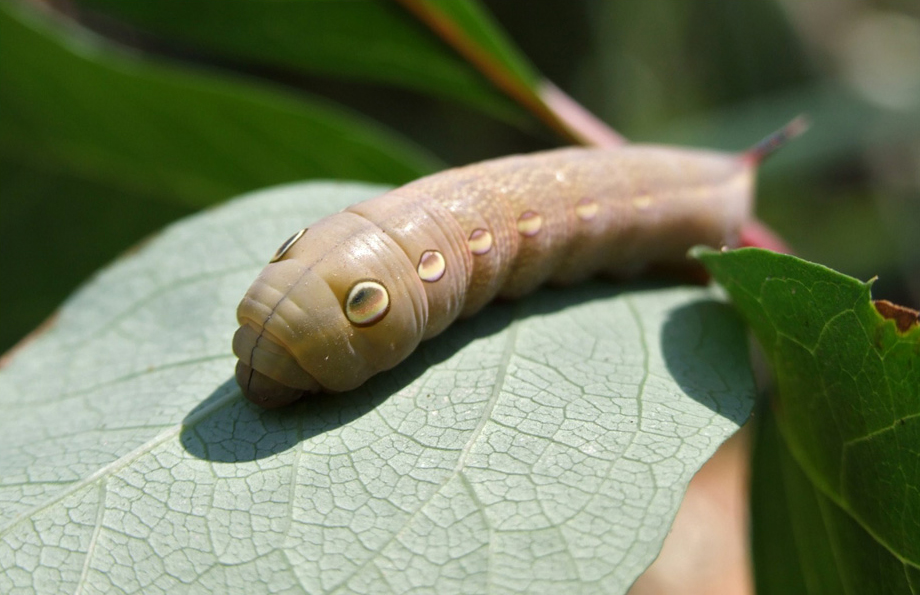
Larva

== Biology ==
The larvae feed on Vitis and Parthenocissus species.
