= HMS Ashanti =

Two ships of the Royal Navy have been named HMS Ashanti after the Ashanti people.

- HMS Ashanti (F51) was a Tribal-class destroyer launched in 1937 and sold for breaking up in 1949.
- HMS Ashanti (F117) was a Tribal-class frigate launched in 1959. She was expended as a target in 1988.

== Battle honours ==
- Norway, 1940
- Atlantic, 1940
- Malta Convoys, 1942
- Arctic, 1942–43
- North Africa, 1942–43
- English Channel, 1943–44
- Biscay, 1944
- Normandy, 1944
