= HMS Anna =

Two ships of the Royal Navy have borne the name Anna or HMS Anna:

- Anna (1739 ship) was an 8-gun storeship that the Navy hired in 1739 and purchased in 1741. She was declared unserviceable later in 1741 and was scuttled.
- HMS Anna (1805) was a 12-gun schooner tender named Anna purchased in 1804 and commissioned as HMS Demerara. The French captured her in 1805. However, she apparently was retaken and resumed the name Anna, another HMS Demerara (1806) having already come into service; she was broken up in 1809.

== See also ==
- HMS Anna Teresa was a gunvessel and ex-barge purchased in 1797.
- HMS Anne
- HMS Express (1815) was the American merchant vessel Achilles, launched in 1809 in America. Her owners in 1813 renamed her Anna Maria. In 1814 she served the British Royal Navy in North American waters as an advice boat. In 1815 the Royal Navy commissioned her as HMS Express, a ship's tender serving in the Mediterranean. In 1816 she was at the bombardment of Algiers. The Navy sold her at Malta in 1827.
