= HMS Ameer =

Two ships have been named HMS Ameer:

- HMS Ameer (D01), a Bogue-class escort carrier sent to the British Royal Navy under Lend-Lease.
- The original designation for USS Liscome Bay (CVE-56), a Casablanca-class escort carrier. Sank with catastrophic loss of life on 24 November 1943.
