= HMS Albatross =

Six ships of the Royal Navy have borne the name HMS Albatross, after the seabird, the albatross. A seventh was planned but never completed:

- HMS Albatross (1795) was a 16-gun brig-sloop launched in 1795, condemned at Bombay and sold in 1807, and broken up in 1810.
- HMS Albatross (1826) was a survey schooner purchased in 1826 and sold in 1833.
- HMS Albatross (1842) was a 16-gun brig launched in 1842 and broken up in 1860.
- HMS Albatross was to have been a wood screw sloop. She was ordered in 1862 but was cancelled in 1863.
- HMS Albatross (1873) was a Fantome-class composite screw sloop launched in 1873 and broken up in 1889.
- HMS Albatross (1898) was a torpedo boat destroyer launched in 1898, reclassified as a C-class destroyer in 1913 and sold in 1920.
- HMAS Albatross (seaplane tender) was a seaplane tender launched in 1928 for the Royal Australian Navy. She was transferred to the Royal Navy in 1938, and converted to a repair ship in 1942. She was sold into mercantile service in 1946 and was sold for scrapping in 1954.

== See also ==
- HMAS Albatross
