= HMS Alyssum =

Two ships of the Royal Navy have been named HMS Alyssum:

- HMS Alyssum (1915) was an Arabis-class sloop launched in 1915 and sunk in 1917
- HMS Alyssum (K100) was a Flower-class corvette launched in 1941 and transferred to the Free French Naval Forces on completion. She was sunk in 1942
