= HMS Albacore =

Eight ships of the Royal Navy have borne the name HMS Albacore, after the Albacore, a species of fish:

- HMS Albacore (1781) was a 16-gun sloop, formerly the American privateer Royal Louis. She was captured in 1781 by HMS Nymphe and HMS Amphion and was sold in 1784.
- HMS Albacore (1793) was a 16-gun sloop launched at Rotherhithe. She captured several privateers before she was sold in 1802.
- HMS Albacore (1804) was an 18-gun sloop launched in 1804 and sold in 1815. She became a merchantman, sailing out of Guernsey. She was lost on 12 October 1821 while sailing from Buenos Aires to Barbados.
- HMS Albacore (1828) was a schooner launched in 1828 and sold in 1832.
- HMS Albacore (1856) was a wooden screw gunboat launched in 1856, the nameship of the 1855 Albacore class. She was used as a tank vessel from 1874, was hulked in 1882 and was broken up in 1885.
- HMS Albacore (1883) was a composite screw gunboat launched in 1883, the nameship of the 1883 Albacore class. She was sold in 1906.
- HMS Albacore (1909) was a destroyer launched in 1906 and purchased in 1909. She was reclassified as a B-class destroyer in 1913 and was sold in 1919.
- HMS Albacore (J101) was an Algerine-class minesweeper launched in 1942 and broken up in 1963.
