= HMS Arrogant =

Six ships of the Royal Navy have borne the name HMS Arrogant, or HMS Arrogante, whilst another was planned:

- HMS Arrogant (1705) was a 60-gun third rate captured from the French in 1705. She was carrying naval stores between Gibraltar and Port Mahon when she foundered in 1709; there were no survivors.
- HMS Arrogant (1761) was a 74-gun third rate launched in 1761. She was used as a receiving ship, sheer hulk, and floating battery at Bombay from 1804, and was broken up in 1810.
- HMS Arrogante was the French gun-brig Brave of six 24-pounder guns, launched in 1793 and renamed Arrogante in May 1795, that HMS Jason captured from the French in 1798. She was renamed HMS Insolent later in 1798 and was sold in 1818.
- HMS Arrogant (1810) was previously the civilian ship, Ardaseer. Admiral Drury purchased her in 1810 for use as a warship but instead used as a hospital hulk. She was sold in 1842.
- HMS Arrogant (1848) was a wood screw frigate launched in 1848 and sold in 1867.
- HMS Arrogant (1896) was an Arrogant-class second class cruiser launched in 1896. She was used as a depot ship from 1911 and was sold in 1923.
- HMS Arrogant was a planned Centaur-class aircraft carrier, cancelled in 1945.
