= HMS Assurance =

Six ships of the Royal Navy have borne the name Assurance. A seventh was planned but never completed:

- English ship Assurance (1604) was a galleon launched in 1559 as the 48-gun Hope, rebuilt and renamed Assurance in 1604 and broken up in 1645.
- English ship Assurance (1646) was a 32-gun fourth-rate frigate launched in 1646, and sold in 1698.
- HMS Assurance (1702) was a 66-gun third-rate ship of the line, formerly the French Assuré built in 1697, captured in 1702 and broken up in 1712.
- HMS Assurance (1747) was a 44-gun fifth-rate frigate launched in 1747 and wrecked in 1753.
- HMS Assurance (1780) was a 44-gun fifth-rate ship launched in 1780 and broken up in 1815.
- HMS Assurance (1856) was a wooden screw gunvessel launched in 1856 and sold in 1870.
- HMS Assurance (1940) was a fleet tug. The Royal Navy had her fitted out for ocean service and then used her to tow vessels that had sustained damage from German torpedo attacks. Assurance was wrecked on 18 October 1941 and still lies on Bluick Rock north of Greencastle, Co. Donegal.
- HMS Assurance (P462) was to have been an Amphion-class submarine, ordered in 1945 but cancelled later that year.
