= HMS Antrim =

Two ships of the Royal Navy have been named HMS Antrim, after County Antrim in Northern Ireland:

- HMS Antrim (1903) was a Devonshire-class armoured cruiser launched in 1903. She served in World War I and was broken up in 1923.
- HMS Antrim (D18) was a County-class destroyer launched in 1967. Antrim served in the Falklands War and helped re-take South Georgia. She was sold to the Chilean Navy in 1984 and renamed Almirante Cochrane after Thomas Cochrane.
