= HMS Alecto =

Four ships of the Royal Navy have borne the name HMS Alecto, after Alecto, one of the Erinyes of Greek mythology:

- HMS Alecto (1781) was a 12-gun fire ship launched in 1781 and sold in 1802.
- HMS Alecto (1839) was a wood paddle sloop launched in 1839 and broken up in 1865.
- HMS Alecto (1882) was a composite paddle vessel launched in 1882 and sold in 1899.
- HMS Alecto (1911) was a depot ship launched in 1911 and sold in 1949.
