= HMS Anglesea =

Three ships of the Royal Navy have borne the name HMS Anglesea. A fourth Royal Navy vessel carried the related name HMS Anglesey:

- HMS Anglesea (1694), a 44-gun fourth rate launched in 1694 and the first naval vessel built at Plymouth Dockyard. She was sunk as a breakwater off Sheerness in 1742.
- HMS Anglesea (1742), a 44-gun fifth rate launched in 1742, captured by France in 1745 and in French naval service as L'Anglesea until 1753.
- HMS Anglesea (1746), a 44-gun fifth rate launched in 1746 and sunk as a breakwater in 1764.
- HMS Anglesey (P277), an offshore patrol vessel launched in 1978 and sold to the Bangladesh Navy in 2003.

== See also ==
- Marquis of Anglesea (1815 ship), wrecked in 1829
- TSS Anglesey (1887), a steam turbine cargo vessel
