= HMS Ardent =

Eight ships of the Royal Navy have been named HMS Ardent, whilst another two were planned:

- HMS Ardent (1764) was a 64-gun third rate launched in 1764. She was captured by the French in 1779, but was recaptured in 1782 and renamed HMS Tiger. She was sold in 1784.
- HMS Ardent (1782) was a 64-gun third rate launched in 1782. She caught fire and exploded near Corsica in 1794.
- HMS Ardent (1796) was a 64-gun third rate launched in 1796. She was used for harbour service from 1812 and was broken up in 1824.
- HMS Ardent (1841) was a wooden paddle sloop launched in 1841 and scrapped in 1865.
- HMS Ardent was to have been a wooden screw sloop, but she was renamed HMS Rattler before her launch in 1843.
- HMS Ardent (1894) was an Ardent-class torpedo boat destroyer launched in 1894 and broken up in 1911.
- HMS Ardent (1913) was an Acasta-class destroyer launched in 1913 and sunk at the battle of Jutland in 1916.
- HMS Ardent (H41) was an A-class destroyer launched in 1929 and sunk in 1940.
- HMS Ardent (P437) was to have been an Amphion-class submarine, but she was cancelled in 1945.
- HMS Ardent (F184) was a Type 21 frigate launched in 1975 and sunk in 1982 during the Falklands War.

== Battle honours ==
- Camperdown 1791
- Copenhagen 1801
- Crimea 1854–55
- Jutland 1916
- Atlantic 1939–40
- Norway 1940
- Scharnhorst 1940
- Falklands 1982

== See also ==
HMAS Ardent
