= Achates =

In Greek and Roman mythology, the name of two individuals

In Greek and Roman mythology, Achates (Ancient Greek: Ἀχάτης) may refer to the following personages:

- Achates, a companion of the exiled Aeneas.
- Achates, a Sicilian who came to Aristaeus in order to join Dionysus in his Indian campaign.

== Saints ==
- Achates of Thun, or Achathus, a first-century Christian saint and companion of Saint Beatus of Thun.
- Acathius of Melitene, also known as Acathes, a third-century Christian bishop and saint
