= HMS Acasta =

Three ships of the Royal Navy have borne the name HMS Acasta, whilst another two were planned:

- HMS Acasta (1797) was a 40-gun fifth rate frigate launched in 1797 and broken up in 1821.
- HMS Acasta was to have been a wooden screw frigate. She was laid down in 1861 but was cancelled in 1863.
- HMS Acasta (1912) was an Acasta-class destroyer launched in 1912 and sold for scrap in 1921.
- HMS Acasta (H09) was an A-class destroyer launched in 1929. She was sunk in 1940 by the German battleships Scharnhorst and Gneisenau.
- HMS Acasta (P452) was to have been an Amphion-class submarine, but was cancelled in 1945.
