= HMS Adder =

Seven ships of the Royal Navy have borne the name HMS Adder, after the snake:

- HMS Adder (1782) was an 8-gun galley purchased in 1782 and sold in 1787.
- HMS Adder (1797) was a 12-gun gunboat launched in 1797 and broken up in 1805.
- HMS Adder (1805) was a 12-gun gun-brig launched in 1805 but captured by French forces the following year having run aground on the French coast.
- HMS Adder (1813) was a 12-gun gun-brig launched in 1813 and transferred to Coastguard service in 1826. She was wrecked in 1832.
- HMS Adder (1814) was a cutter launched in 1814 as HMS Seagull. She was renamed HMS Adder in 1817 and remained in service until 1825.
- HMS Adder (1826) was a wooden paddle packet ship, launched in 1826 as the GPO ship Crocodile. She was transferred to the Navy in 1837 and was sold in 1870.
- HMS Adder (1905) was a tender transferred from the War Department in 1905. She was renamed HMS Attentive in 1919, and was sold in 1923.
