= HMS Arbutus =

Three ships of the Royal Navy have been named HMS Arbutus:

- HMS Arbutus (1917) was a Anchusa-class sloop that served in World War I. She was torpedoed by the German U-boat SM UB-65 off the Irish coast on 15 December 1917, and sunk during towing on 16 December.
- HMS Arbutus (K86) was a Flower-class corvette, launched on 5 June 1940, and torpedoed and sunk by U-136 on 5 February 1942.
- HMS Arbutus (K403) was a modified Flower-class corvette, launched on 26 January 1944, and loaned to the Royal New Zealand Navy. Decommissioned in 1948, she was returned to the Royal Navy and broken up in June 1951.
