= Abondance (ship) =

- Abondance

History

France
- Name: Abondance
- Namesake: Abundance
- Builder: Jean-Joseph Ginoux, Le Havre
- Laid down: January 1780
- Launched: 16 September 1780
- Captured: 12 December 1781

Great Britain
- Name: HMS Abondance
- Acquired: 12 December 1781 by capture
- Fate: Sold 1784

Great Britain
- Name: Abondance
- Acquired: 1784 by purchase
- Fate: No longer listed in 1786

General characteristics
- Class & type: Baleine-class gabare
- Tons burthen: 524, or 52650/94, or 600 (bm)
- Length: Overall:132 ft 6 in (40.4 m); Keel:113 ft 11 7/8 in (34.7 m)
- Beam: 29 ft 5 3/4 in (9.0 m)
- Depth of hold: 11 ft 9 in (3.6 m)
- Propulsion: Sails
- Complement: French service: 90; UK; Transport:200; Storeship:52
- Armament: French service: 20 × 8-pounder guns; British service: Troopship: 24 × 9-pounder + 4 × 4-pounder guns; Storeship: 14 guns

Abondance was a French Baleine-class gabare (cargo ship) launched in 1780. The Royal Navy captured her on 11 December 1781 and took her into service as a troop transport and store ship under the name HMS Abondance. After the end of the war with France the Admiralty sold her in 1784. She then became a merchantman.

== Career ==
Abondance was launched at Le Havre in September 1780. She sailed on 11 December 1781 for the Antilles in a convoy under the command of Admiral de Guichen. She was under the command of a M. Dupuis and was carrying 248 soldiers and ordnance, stores, and provisions.

On the 12th Admiral Kempenfelt, who had been sent out by the Admiralty with an unduly weak force to intercept de Guichen, sighted the French convoy in the Bay of Biscay through a temporary clearance in a fog, at a moment when de Guichen's warships were to leeward of the convoy, and attacked the transports at once. de Guichen could not prevent the British from capturing 15 of the transports, Abondance among them, destroying two or three others, and driving the remainder into a panic-stricken flight. The survivors returned to port; de Guichen therefore returned to port also.

The Royal Navy sent Abondance into Plymouth and then took her into service, rating her as a 28-gun sixth rate. Lieutenant N. Phillips commissioned her in April 1783 and on 23 May sailed for North America. She made several trips carrying black loyalists to Halifax, among them the fiery Methodist preacher Moses Wilkinson. In November, she evacuated the last group, some 80 members of the Black Brigade, a unit of black loyalists, from New York.

Disposal: Phillips paid off Abondance in March 1784. The Admiralty then sold her for £2,200 on 29 April.

Abondance entered Lloyd's Register in 1784 with T. Eve, master, L. Teffier, owner, and trade London–Ostend. She was no longer listed in 1786.
