= HMS A13 =

Submarine of the Royal Navy

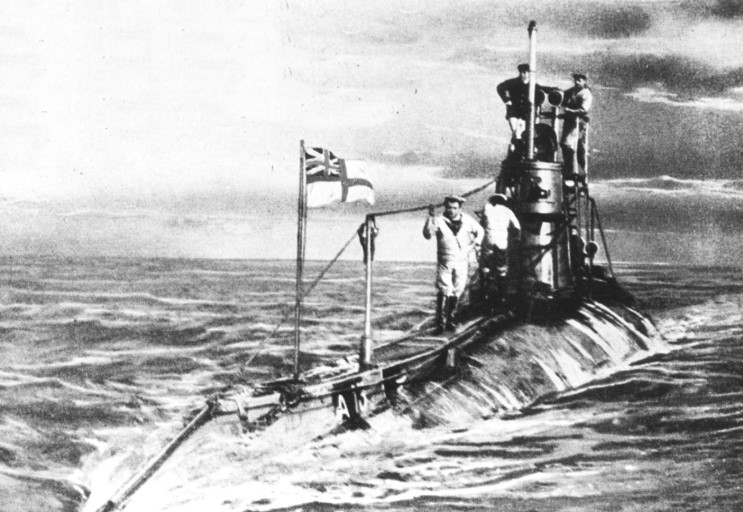
- HMS A13 underway

History

United Kingdom
- Name: HMS A13
- Builder: Vickers, Sons & Maxim Ltd. Barrow-in-Furness
- Laid down: 19 February 1903
- Launched: 18 April 1905
- Commissioned: 22 June 1908
- Fate: Sold for scrap in 1920

General characteristics
- Class & type: A-class submarine
- Displacement: 190 long tons (193 t) surfaced; 206 long tons (209 t) submerged
- Length: 105 ft (32.0 m)
- Beam: 12 ft 9 in (3.9 m)
- Draught: 10 ft 8 in (3.3 m)
- Installed power: 500 bhp (370 kW) (heavy oil engine); 150 hp (110 kW) (electric motor)
- Propulsion: 1 × Hornsby-Akroyd oil engine; 1 × electric motor
- Speed: 11 knots (20 km/h; 13 mph) surfaced; 6 knots (11 km/h; 6.9 mph) submerged
- Range: 400 nautical miles (740 km; 460 mi) at 10 kn (19 km/h; 12 mph) surfaced
- Complement: 2 officers and 9 ratings
- Armament: 2 × 18-inch (45 cm) torpedo tubes

HMS A13 was an A-class submarine built for the Royal Navy in the first decade of the 20th century. She was the first British submarine not to use a petrol engine. After surviving World War I, she was sold for scrap in 1920.

== Design and description ==
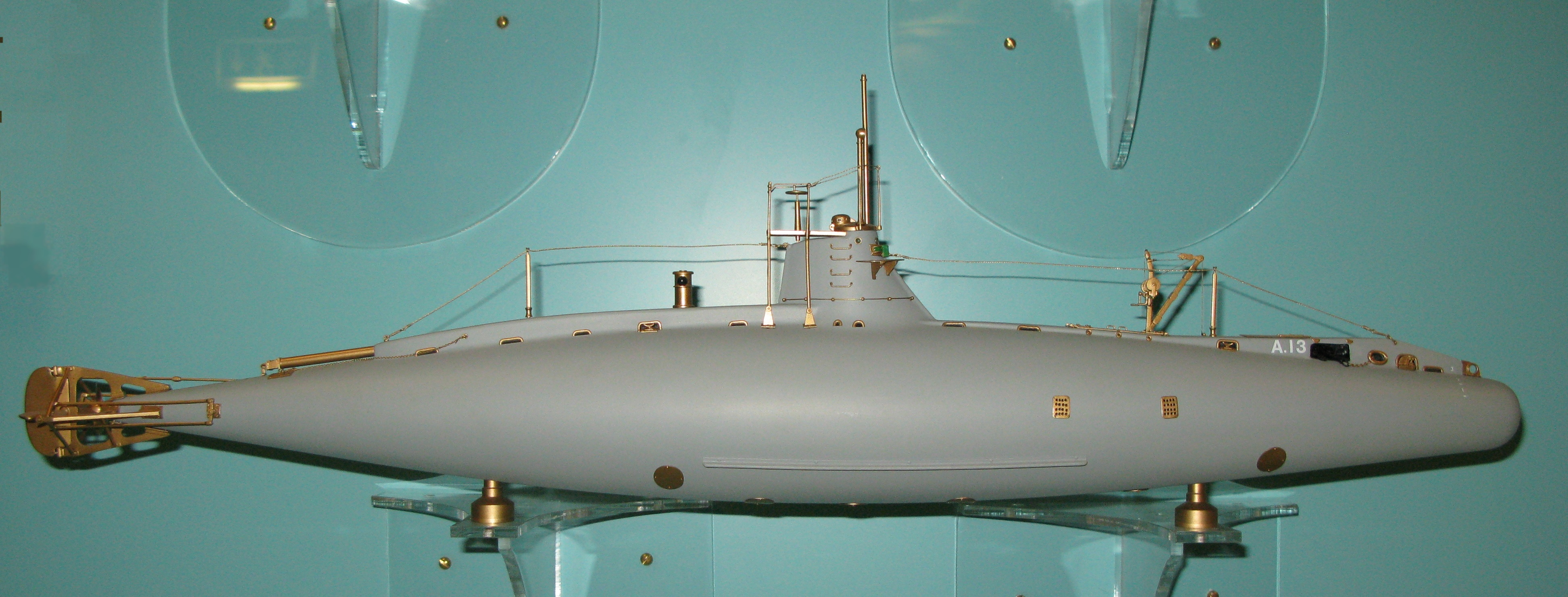
A model of A13

A13 was a member of the first British class of submarines, although slightly larger, faster and more heavily armed than the lead ship, HMS A1. The submarine had a length of 105 feet 1 inch (32.0 m) overall, a beam of 12 feet 9 inches (3.9 m) and a mean draught of 10 feet 8 inches (3.3 m). They displaced 190 long tons (190 t) on the surface and 206 long tons (209 t) submerged. The A-class submarines had a crew of 2 officers and 9 ratings.

For surface running, A13 was powered by a single vertical, six-cylinder 500-brake-horsepower (373 kW) Hornsby-Akroyd oil engine that drove one propeller shaft. When submerged the propeller was driven by a 150-horsepower (112 kW) electric motor. They could reach 11 knots (20 km/h; 13 mph) on the surface and 6 knots (11 km/h; 6.9 mph) underwater. The heavy oil engine was 3 long tons (3 t) heavier than the petrol engines used by the other boats in the class and an equal amount of fuel had to be removed, which reduced their range despite the heavy oil engine's more economical consumption. On the surface, the boat had a range of about 400 nautical miles (740 km; 460 mi) at 10 knots (19 km/h; 12 mph); submerged the boat had a range of 30 nautical miles (56 km; 35 mi) at 5 knots (9.3 km/h; 5.8 mph).

The boats were armed with two 18-inch (45 cm) torpedo tubes in the bow. They could carry a pair of reload torpedoes, but generally did not as doing so that they had to compensate for their weight by an equivalent weight of fuel.

== Construction and career ==
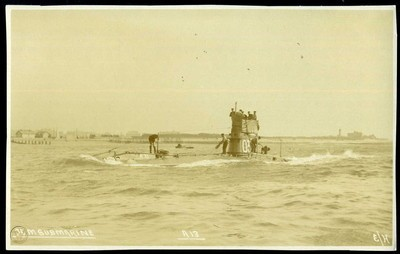
H.M. Submarine A13 circa 1910

A13 was ordered as part of the 1903–04 Naval Programme from at Vickers. She was laid down at the shipyard in Barrow-in-Furness in 1903, launched on 8 February 1905 and completed on 8 May 1905. The boat was broken up in 1920.
