= HMS Amphion =

Seven vessels of the British Royal Navy have borne the name HMS Amphion, after the Greek hero Amphion.

- HMS Amphion (1780), launched in 1780, was a 32-gun fifth-rate.
- HMS Amphion (1798), launched in 1798, was a 32-gun fifth-rate.
- HMS Amphion (1846), launched in 1846, was a wooden-hulled screw frigate.
- HMS Amphion (1883), launched in 1883, was a Leander-class protected cruiser.
- HMS Amphion (1911), launched in 1911, was an Active-class scout cruiser, she was sunk on the 6 August 1914 becoming the first Royal Navy ship to be sunk in World War I.
- HMS Amphion, launched in 1934, was a Leander-class light cruiser transferred to the Royal Australian Navy and renamed HMAS Perth.
- HMS Amphion (P439), launched in 1944, was the name ship of her class of submarines. (Before launch she swapped names with HMS Anchorite.)
