= Peter Hammersley =

English Royal Navy officer (1928–2020)

Rear-Admiral Peter Hammersley CB OBE
- Born: 18 May 1928; Stoke-on-Trent, Staffordshire, England
- Died: 16 January 2020 (aged 91); Bramley, Surrey, England
- Military career
- Allegiance: United Kingdom
- Branch: Royal Navy
- Service years: 1946–1982
- Rank: Rear-Admiral
- Nickname: Spam

Rear-Admiral Peter Gerald Hammersley CB OBE (nicknamed Spam; 18 May 1928 – 16 January 2020) was an English Royal Navy officer who served from 1946 to 1982. Hammersley won a scholarship to Britannia Royal Naval College to train as a deck officer but his eyesight was too poor. Instead, he chose to become an engineer and studied at the Royal Naval Engineering College from 1946 to 1950. He trained onboard HMS Frobisher and HMS Duke of York and served on HMS Ocean during the Korean War. Hammersley specialised in submarines from 1954 and in 1959 served on secondment to the US Navy on the nuclear submarine Nautilus. In 1960 he became the first marine engineering officer to serve aboard the Royal Navy's first nuclear-powered submarine, HMS Dreadnought. Hammersley helped design the Swiftsure-class of submarines and commanded a number of shore installations including the Royal Naval Engineering College. He was aide-de-camp to Queen Elizabeth II and Chief Staff Officer Engineering for the fleet in the 1982 Falklands War. After retirement in 1982 he had roles in a number of commercial and charitable organisations.

== Early life ==
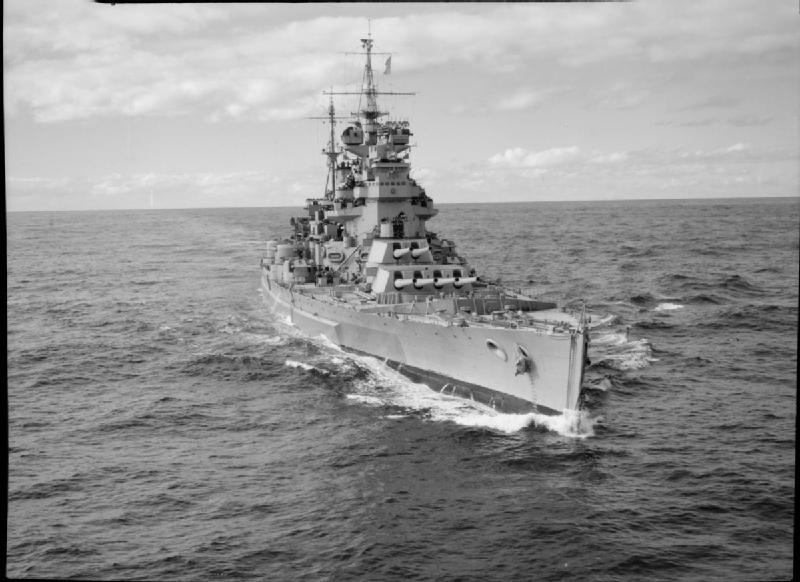
HMS Duke of York

Peter Gerald Hammersley was born in Stoke-on-Trent, Staffordshire, on 18 May 1928, the son of Robert Stevens Hammersley and his wife Norah Hammersley (née Kirkham). His father was severely wounded in action during the First World War and died when Hammersley was seventeen. Hammersley attended Newcastle High School and Denstone College. During the Second World War, rationing in Britain meant processed meats such as Spam were widely used, so, for Hammersley, a nickname that might otherwise have been "Ham" became "Spam". Hammersley won a scholarship to Britannia Royal Naval College, Dartmouth, to train as a naval command (or deck) officer, joining the service in 1946. He was unable to attend the college due to poor eyesight so switched to the Royal Naval Engineering College, Manadon. He studied there from 1946 to 1950 and was awarded a first class degree. As a cadet, Hammersley gained seagoing experience aboard the training cruiser Frobisher and received engineering training aboard the battleship Duke of York in 1948.

Hammersley was promoted from acting rank to substantive sub-lieutenant (engineering) on 1 March 1949 and to lieutenant (engineering) on 22 November 1950. (Note: Hammersley was granted seniority of 1 April 1948 for the rank of sub-lieutenant and 1 July 1950 for the rank of lieutenant.) He served aboard the light cruiser Liverpool from 1950 until he was posted to the advanced marine engineering course at Royal Naval College, Greenwich in 1951. Upon completion of the course he joined the aircraft carrier Ocean and served on active duty during the final year of the Korean War (1950–1953).

== Submarine Service ==
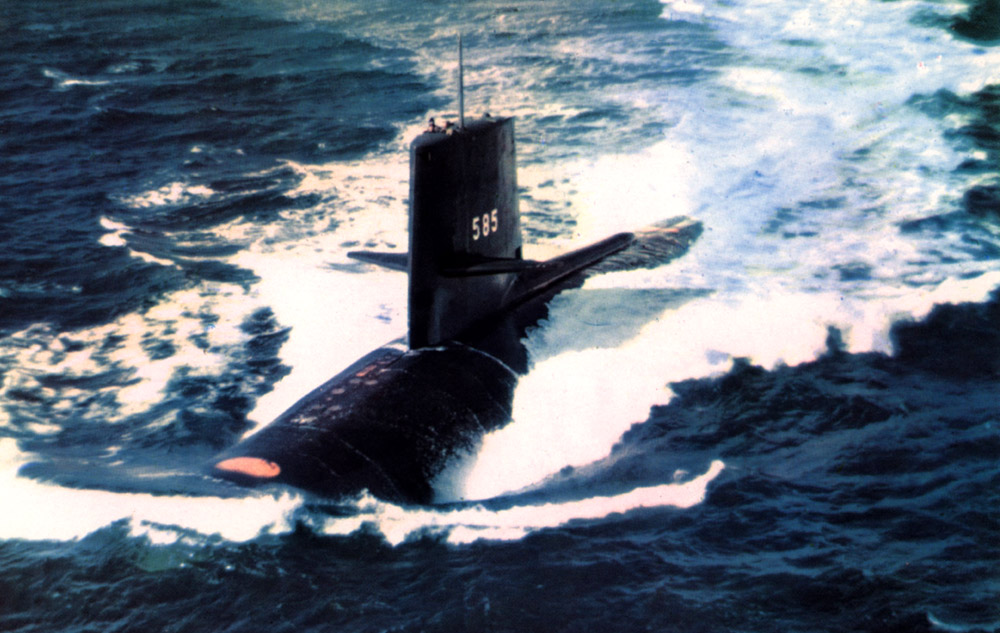
USS Skipjack

Hammersley joined the Submarine Service in 1954. He served on the conventional diesel-electric submarines Alaric and Tiptoe in the mid-1950s. During this time Earl Mountbatten, as First Sea Lord, was keen that the Royal Navy acquire nuclear submarines, such as those fielded by the US Navy. These vessels had the advantage over traditional diesel-electric models in that they could remain submerged for long patrols. Mountbatten met with US Navy admiral and "father of the nuclear navy" Hyman G. Rickover to discuss the provision of expertise to a British nuclear submarine programme. Rickover agreed to provide Royal Navy officers with seagoing experience on US nuclear submarines but insisted on selecting which officers would serve on secondment. Mountbatten refused this caveat and insisted on selecting the men himself. One of those chosen was Hammersley who, in 1957, was summoned from Imperial College London, where he was studying for a diploma in nuclear engineering, to meet with Mountbatten and Rickover. Rickover was uninterested but Hammersley was approved to travel to the US to take part in the programme.

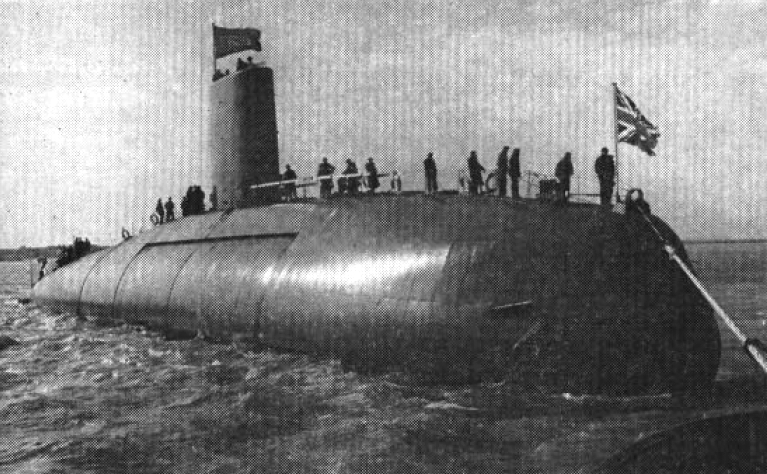
HMS Dreadnought

Hammersley was promoted to lieutenant commander on 26 September 1958 and afterwards served aboard the USS Skipjack, commissioned in April 1959, under Commander (later Vice Admiral) W. W. Behrens Jr. (Note: Hammersley was granted seniority of 1 July 1958 for the rank of lieutenant commander.) Rickover's orders prohibited British officers from standing watches unsupervised and stipulated that they must arrive in the US unaccompanied by their families. Hammersley became an exception, travelling with his new wife, and, after five months on board, being allowed to stand watches alone by Behrens. During this time, Rickover approved the provision of technical support and the supply of a Skipjack-type nuclear propulsion system to the British under the 1958 US–UK Mutual Defence Agreement. This led to the construction of HMS Dreadnought.

Hammersley was recalled to the UK in October 1959 to assist in the completion of Dreadnought, whose launch took place on 21 October 1960. At the naming and launching ceremony, Hammersley was presented to the Queen. Hammersley attended the vessel's commissioning in 1963 and served as her first nuclear engineering officer for the following 18 months. Afterwards, he helped train nuclear engineers for the Royal Navy. He was promoted to commander on 30 June 1964, at which time he was an associate member of the Institution of Mechanical Engineers (IMechE) and of the Institute of Marine Engineers (IMarE). From 1964 to 1968, Hammersley worked on the design of the Swiftsure-class submarines at MOD Foxhill, Bath. One of the measures he implemented was urinals at the rear of the vessel, a feature found on Skipjack but not Dreadnought. This area of the Swiftsures was later humorously known as "Spam's Folly". Hammersley was appointed an Officer of the Order of the British Empire in the 1965 Birthday Honours. He served as Base Engineer Officer at Her Majesty's Naval Base, Clyde from 1968 to 1970.

== Senior commands ==
Hammersley was promoted to captain on 30 June 1971, by which time he had also become a member of the IMechE and the IMarE. Hammersley held a number of naval staff roles from 1970 to 1978, including assistant director of the submarine section of the Director General of Ships and the Ministry of Defences's Directorate of Naval Operational Requirements. He also headed facilities such as MOS Foxhill and HMS Defiance, the navy's nuclear repair and refuelling facility at Her Majesty's Naval Base, Devonport. From 1978 to 1980, he served as head of the Royal Naval Engineering College, in charge of the training of 500 junior engineer officers. He was visited there by Mountbatten who asked him for a few paragraphs of text about the machinery of Dreadnought for inclusion in his memoirs. Mountbatten left stating that "there's no hurry for a reply as I am off to Ireland for a month at the end of the week"; whilst in Ireland Mountbatten was killed in an IRA bomb attack.

Hammersley was appointed aide-de-camp to Queen Elizabeth II on 7 January 1980, serving until 7 July 1980 when he was promoted to rear admiral. He was appointed a Companion of the Order of the Bath in the 1982 New Year Honours and was chief staff officer engineering to the commander-in-chief, Fleet (Sir John Fieldhouse) during that year's Falklands War.

== Personal life and retirement ==
Hammersley retired from the Royal Navy on 7 October 1982. He was chief executive officer of the Internal Combustion Engine Manufacturers' Association from 1982 to 1985 and as director of the British Marine Equipment Council from 1985 to 1992. He was a founding member of the Worshipful Company of Engineers in 1983 and as master in 1988. He was a governor at Denstone College from 1984 to 1998 (including a period as chairman) and a fellow of the Anglican Woodard Schools Corporation from 1992 to 1998.

Hammersley married Cynthia Bolton in 1959; they had two children. In his spare time he was a parish councillor and a golfer and gardener. He was a member of the Army and Navy Club. He held strong Christian beliefs and was a regular churchgoer. Hammersley died on 16 January 2020 at his home in Bramley, Surrey; his last words were "game over, game over".
