= 4th Submarine Squadron =

- Active: 1949 – 10 January 1969
- Country: United Kingdom
- Branch: Royal Navy
- Size: Squadron
- Garrison/HQ: HMAS Penguin, Sydney, Australia

The 4th Submarine Squadron was a unit of the Royal Navy operating conventional submarines. It was established at HMAS Penguin, Sydney, Australia, in 1949 partly to provide anti-submarine warfare training to Royal Australian Navy (RAN) and Royal New Zealand Navy personnel. The Royal Navy transitioned to nuclear-powered submarines from 1960 and notified the Australians that the 4th Submarine Squadron would be disbanded. The RAN decided to procure its own submarines to replace the squadron in the training role and purchased four Oberon-class vessels in 1963. To prepare the RAN to maintain these vessels the Royal Navy agreed to refit five T-class submarines, including at least three from the 4th Submarine Squadron, at Cockatoo Island Dockyard in Sydney. The 1st Australian Submarine Squadron was operational by 1969, upon which the Royal Navy disbanded the 4th Submarine Squadron.

== Early history ==
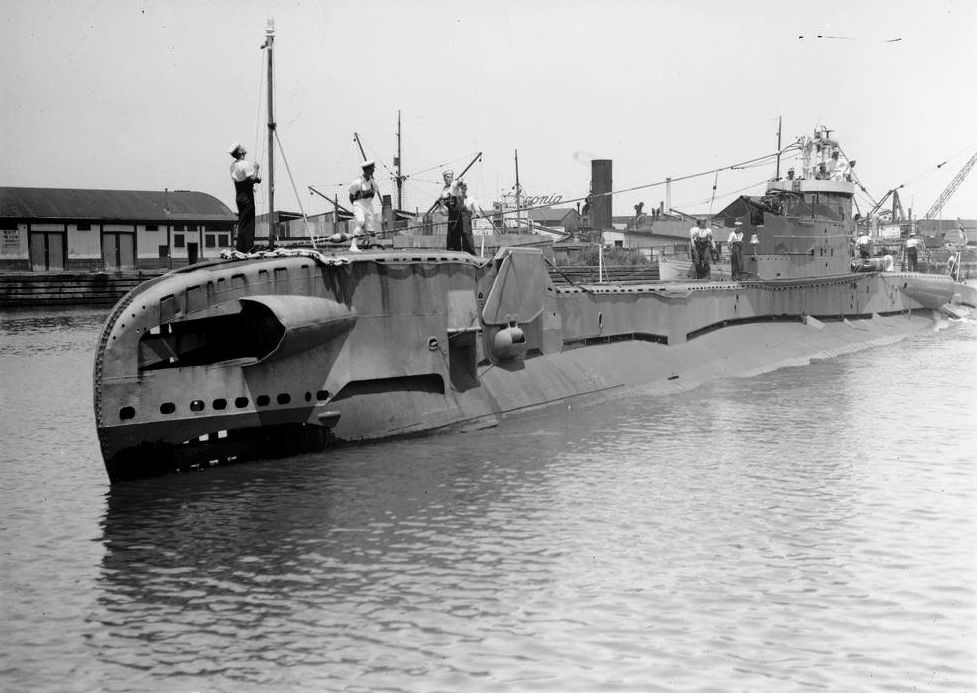
HMS Telemachus in Melbourne, 1949

During the Second World War an earlier incarnation of the 4th Submarine Squadron operated out of Trincomalee in the British colony of Ceylon. Its duties included landing special forces in Sumatra during the Japanese occupation of the Dutch East Indies.

In 1949 the 4th Submarine Squadron was established at Sydney, Australia. The submarines were based at HMAS Penguin though they also regularly docked at the Royal Australian Navy's (RAN) Cockatoo Island Dockyard. The squadron operated conventional (diesel-electric) submarines. Its role was partly to assist with the training of Commonwealth navies in anti-submarine warfare. In this role the squadron also regularly visited New Zealand to train the Royal New Zealand Navy, as well as training in Australian waters and near Fiji.

== Transition to Australian-operated submarines ==
As the Royal Navy transitioned to nuclear submarines from 1960 it sought to pass the anti-submarine warfare training role to the Commonwealth navies. It informed the Australian navy of its intention to disband the 4th Submarine Squadron and the RAN agreed to procure its own conventional submarines (they ordered four Oberon-class submarines in 1963).

To help prepare the RAN for operating its own submarines the Royal Navy agreed to refit submarines at Cockatoo Island Dockyard. From 1960 British T-class submarines were refitted there, at the expense of the Australian Department of the Navy. The first vessel was HMS Tabard, which was in the dock from November 1960 to March 1962. This was followed by HMS Trump, HMS Taciturn and two other T-class vessels.

The 4th Submarine Squadron was disbanded on 10 January 1969, being replaced by the 1st Australian Submarine Squadron, initially comprising HMAS Oxley and HMAS Otway. The Royal Navy left its facilities at Penguin, which was taken over by the Royal Australian Navy's diving unit.

== Boats operated ==
Seven T-class submarines and three Amphion-class submarines were operated by the 4th Submarine Squadron at some point. The first three boats were HMS Telemachus, HMS Thorough and HMS Tactician. These were replaced by HMS Aurochs, HMS Andrew and HMS Anchorite in 1957. These, in turn, were replaced by HMS Tabard, HMS Taciturn, HMS Trump and HMS Tapir in 1960. Trump was the last vessel of the squadron to leave Australia for Britain.
