= HMAS Platypus (naval base) =

Australian naval base

- North Sydney and Neutral Bay, Sydney, New South Wales in Australia

Site information
- Type: Submarine base
- Owner: Department of Defence (1967–2005); Sydney Harbour Federation Trust (2005–present)
- Operator: Royal Australian Navy (1967–1999)
- Open to the public: Since May 2018

Location
- Location in New South Wales
- Coordinates: 33°50′35″S 151°13′02″E

Site history
- In use: 18 August 1967 – 14 May 1999
- Fate: Decommissioned; After remediation and refurbishment, open to the public since May 2018

Garrison information
- Garrison: Royal Australian Navy Submarine Service
- Occupants: Australian Fourth Submarine Squadron; RAN Torpedo Maintenance Establishment

HMAS Platypus is a former Royal Australian Navy (RAN) submarine base at 118 High Street, North Sydney with moorings in Neutral Bay. It was located upon the site of the Royal Australian Navy Torpedo Maintenance Establishment (RANTME), it built on the site of the former North Sydney Gas Works that operated on the site from 1877 and resumed by the Commonwealth in 1942. The Fleet Intermediate Maintenance Activity (FIMA) Workshops building on the site was originally used for torpedo assembly and storage during World War II. It was later modified for submarine maintenance and repair, with a steel tower added to the northern end of the building for testing, cleaning and maintenance of periscopes.

== History ==
HMAS Platypus was commissioned on 18 August 1967, conjointly with the Royal Navy Fourth Submarine Squadron as the eastern Australian base for the six RAN Oberon-class submarines. The first of the Australian Oberon-class submarines arrived from the United Kingdom the day Platypus was commissioned into the Royal Australian Navy, HMAS Oxley. Over its years of operation, Platypus has provided home base for the First Australian Submarine Squadron (later the Australian Submarine Squadron), including Oxley, Otway, Ovens, Onslow, Orion and Otama, as well as the Royal Navy's HMS Trump, Tabard and Odin.

Platypus, which was referred to as "Plats" by the ship's company, was the only dedicated submarine base in Australia. Engineering workshops, medical facilities, the submarine school, communications centre and administration were all housed at the base providing the operational support required for the six submarines and their crews. While the submarines operated from the waterfront, the RAN's torpedo workshops occupied the southern part of the site.

In 1999, Platypus and the torpedo workshops closed down when the Australian Government relocated its submarine base to HMAS Stirling in Western Australia. Platypus was decommissioned on 14 May 1999.

== Current and future use ==
The site was handed over to the Sydney Harbour Federation Trust (SHFT) on 23 July 2005, and is partially open to public. The SHFT has carried out extensive works on site since 2010 including remediation of ground contamination and buildings. The first stage of the remediation project included above ground works, demolition of the three storey Administration Building at the north of the site and part of the wharf, removal of hazardous materials, repairs to the seawall and remaining wharf. A large odour control enclosure, an emission control system and water treatment plant were constructed for the remediation works. Around 3,000 tonnes of tar–containing materials were excavated and removed by barge for off–site disposal. An additional 27,000 tonnes of material remained for on–site treatment and stabilisation. The remaining material was then used to backfill the excavated area and to create a mound capped with clean soil, forming the base for the public park at the northern end of the site. In May 2018 public access was provided to the foreshore areas and northern park via a new pedestrian walkway from Kesterton Park to the south, and a new staircase linking to Kiara Close at the north of the site.

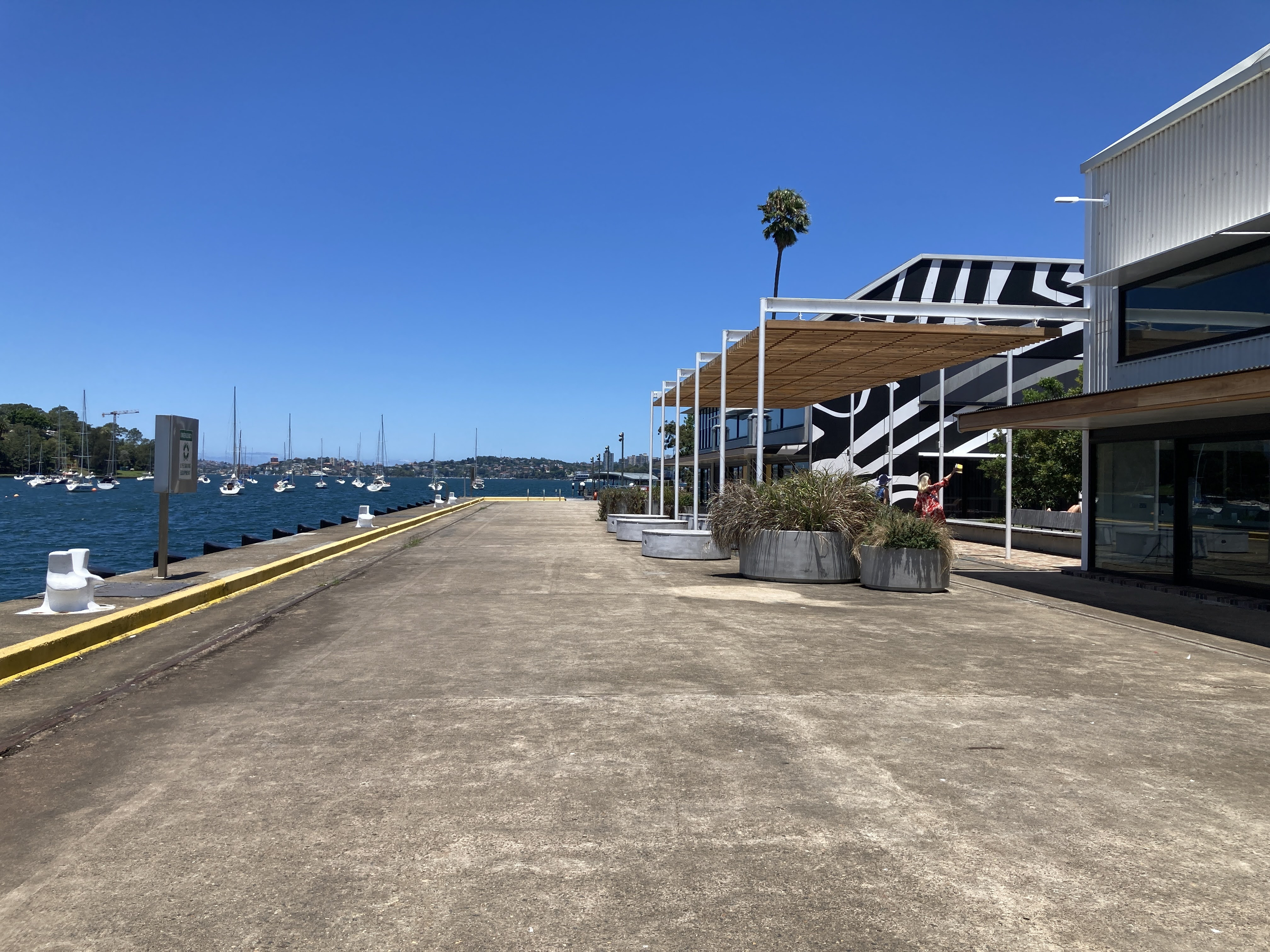
The former submarine wharf and converted buildings at Sub Base Platypus in 2023

The Trust's board approved the Platypus Management Plan in December 2016 and the site is being remediated and refurbished to allow future public access. In August 2017 it was announced that the site will be opened to the public in mid-2018, to be known as Sub Base Platypus and 'providing a range of facilities and venues for cultural performances, function areas, cafes and restaurants, as well as offices and commercial spaces. Sailing's national sporting Australian Sailing is locating its office and training facility here early in 2020'.

During 2016, parts of the site were used for the recording of the television series, season eleven of The Biggest Loser.

On 18 August 2017 a 50th Anniversary and Submariners Memorial dedication ceremony took place in the Northern Park, now known as Oberon Park. The official party included Minister for Defence Marise Payne and former commanding officers. The service dedicated a memorial that features a restored anchor from HMAS Oxley, sitting on a circular precast concrete plinth.

== See also ==
- List of former Royal Australian Navy bases
- HMAS Penguin (naval base)
