= HMS Artful (P456) =

Submarine of the Royal Navy

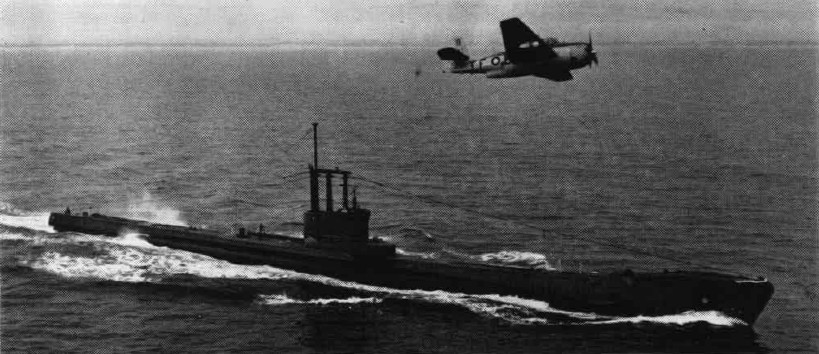
- A RCN Avenger AS.3 over HMS Artful in the mid-1950s

History

United Kingdom
- Ordered: 7 April 1943
- Builder: Scotts of Greenock
- Laid down: 8 June 1944
- Launched: 22 May 1947
- Commissioned: 23 February 1948
- Decommissioned: September 1969
- Identification: Pennant number P456
- Fate: Sold to be broken up for scrap, 16 June 1972.; Broken up at Cairnryan, June 1972

General characteristics
- Class & type: Amphion-class submarine
- Displacement: 1,360 long tons (1,382 t) surfaced; 1,590 long tons (1,616 t) submerged
- Length: 293 ft 6 in (89.46 m)
- Beam: 22 ft 4 in (6.81 m)
- Draught: 18 ft 1 in (5.51 m)
- Propulsion: 2 × 2,150 hp (1,603 kW) Admiralty ML 8-cylinder diesel engines; 2 × 625 hp (466 kW) electric motors; 2 shafts
- Speed: 18.5 knots (34.3 km/h; 21.3 mph) surfaced; 8 knots (15 km/h; 9.2 mph) submerged
- Range: 10,500 nmi (19,400 km; 12,100 mi) at 11 kn (20 km/h; 13 mph) surfaced; 16 nmi (30 km; 18 mi) at 8 kn (15 km/h; 9.2 mph) or 90 nmi (170 km; 100 mi) at 3 kn (5.6 km/h; 3.5 mph) submerged
- Test depth: 350 ft (110 m)
- Complement: 60
- Armament: 6 × (2 external) bow torpedo tubes; 4 × (2 external) stern torpedo tubes containing a total of 20 × 21 inch (533 mm) torpedoes; 26 mines; 1 × 4 in (100 mm) main deck gun; 1 × Oerlikon 20 mm AA gun; 3 × .303 cal. machine guns

HMS Artful (P456), was an Amphion-class submarine of the Royal Navy, built by Scotts Shipbuilding and Engineering Company of Greenock and launched 22 May 1944.

In 1953 she took part in the Fleet Review to celebrate the Coronation of Queen Elizabeth II. In 1955 she was the first of her class to be rebuilt and streamlined. In 1966 she completed a refit and recommissioned for service with the Home Fleet. In 1967 she undertook a Home Fleet Squadron tour to the West Indies and later that year attended Portsmouth Navy Days.

== Design ==
Like all Amphion-class submarines, Artful had a displacement of 1,360 long tons (1,380 t) when at the surface and 1,590 long tons (1,620 t) while submerged. She had a total length of 293 feet 6 inches (89.46 m), a beam of 22 feet 4 inches (6.81 m), and a draught of 18 feet 1 inch (5.51 m). The submarine was powered by two Admiralty ML eight-cylinder diesel engines generating a power of 2,150 horsepower (1,600 kW) each. She also contained four electric motors each producing 625 horsepower (466 kW) that drove two shafts. She could carry a maximum of 219 tonnes (241 short tons) of diesel, although she usually carried between 159 and 165 tonnes (175 and 182 short tons).

The submarine had a maximum surface speed of 18.5 knots (34.3 km/h; 21.3 mph) and a submerged speed of 8 knots (15 km/h; 9.2 mph). When submerged, she could operate at 3 knots (5.6 km/h; 3.5 mph) for 90 nautical miles (170 km; 100 mi) or at 8 knots (15 km/h; 9.2 mph) for 16 nautical miles (30 km; 18 mi). When surfaced, she was able to travel 15,200 nautical miles (28,200 km; 17,500 mi) at 10 knots (19 km/h; 12 mph) or 10,500 nautical miles (19,400 km; 12,100 mi) at 11 knots (20 km/h; 13 mph). She was fitted with ten 21 inches (530 mm) torpedo tubes, one QF 4 inch naval gun Mk XXIII, one Oerlikon 20 mm cannon, and a .303 British Vickers machine gun. Her torpedo tubes were fitted to the bow and stern, and she could carry twenty torpedoes. Her complement was sixty-one crew members.

== Publications ==
- Colledge, J. J.; Warlow, Ben (2006) [1969]. Ships of the Royal Navy: The Complete Record of All Fighting Ships of the Royal Navy from the 15th Century to the Present (3rd Rev ed.). London: Chatham Publishing. ISBN 978-1-86176-281-8. OCLC 67375475.
