= HMAS Platypus =

Several ships and shore establishments of the Royal Australian Navy have been named HMAS Platypus, after the platypus:

- HMAS Platypus (1868), the former HMVS Cerberus.
- HMAS Platypus (1917), a submarine depot ship built for the Royal Navy as HMS Penguin in 1917, transferred to the RAN in 1919 and scrapped in 1958.
- HMAS Platypus (naval base), a submarine shore base on Sydney Harbour between 1967 and 1999.

== Battle honours ==
Ships named HMAS Platypus are entitled to carry a single battle honour:

- Darwin 1942–43
