= QF 4 inch gun =

QF 4 inch gun can refer to:

- QF 4 inch naval gun Mk I - III
- QF 4 inch Mk V naval gun
- QF 4 inch naval gun Mk IV, XII, XXII
- QF 4 inch Mk XVI naval gun
- QF 4 inch Mk XIX naval gun
- QF 4 inch naval gun Mk XXIII
