= HMS Amphion (P439) =

Submarine of the Royal Navy

- HMS Amphion (P439)

History

United Kingdom
- Ordered: Very late in World War II
- Builder: Vickers-Armstrongs, Barrow-in-Furness
- Laid down: 14 November 1943
- Launched: 31 August 1944
- Commissioned: 27 March 1945
- Identification: Pennant number P439
- Fate: Sold to be broken up for scrap on 24 June 1971. Scrapped at Inverkeithing in July 1971.
- Badge

General characteristics
- Class & type: Amphion class
- Type: submarine
- Displacement: 1,360/1,590 tons (surface/submerged)
- Length: 293 ft 6 in (89.46 m)
- Beam: 22 ft 4 in (6.81 m)
- Draught: 18 ft 1 in (5.51 m)
- Propulsion: 2 × 2,150 hp Admiralty ML 8-cylinder diesel engine, 2 × 625 hp electric motors for submergence driving two shafts
- Speed: 18.5 kn (34.3 km/h) surface, 8 kn (15 km/h) submerged
- Range: 10,500 nmi (19,400 km) at 11 kn (20 km/h) surfaced; 16 nmi (30 km) at 8 kn (15 km/h) or 90 nmi (170 km) at 3 kn (5.6 km/h) submerged
- Test depth: 350 ft (110 m)
- Complement: 60
- Armament: 6 × 21 inch (533 mm) (2 external) bow torpedo tube, 4 × 21" (2 external) stern torpedo tube, containing a total of 20 torpedoes; Mines: 26; 1 × 4" main deck gun, 3 × 0.303 machine gun, 1 × 20 mm AA Oerlikon 20 mm gun

HMS Amphion (S43), modernised configuration, completed c. 1955–60

HMS Amphion (P439), was an Amphion-class submarine of the Royal Navy, built by Vickers-Armstrongs and launched 31 August 1944.

HMS Amphion, later S43, was the first of the class to be launched in August 1944. She was originally to be named as HMS Anchorite but their names were exchanged before launch. Of the class, only Amphion and HMS Astute were completed before the end of the war, and neither were involved in hostilities. In 1953 she took part in the Fleet Review to celebrate the Coronation of Queen Elizabeth II.

== Design ==
Like all Amphion-class submarines, Amphion had a displacement of 1,360 long tons (1,380 t) when at the surface and 1,590 long tons (1,620 t) while submerged. She had a total length of 293 feet 6 inches (89.46 m), a beam of 22 feet 4 inches (6.81 m), and a draught of 18 feet 1 inch (5.51 m). The submarine was powered by two Admiralty ML eight-cylinder diesel engines generating a power of 2,150 horsepower (1,600 kW) each. She also had four electric motors each producing 625 horsepower (466 kW) that drove two shafts. She could carry a maximum of 219 tonnes (241 short tons) of diesel, although she usually carried between 159 and 165 tonnes (175 and 182 short tons).

The submarine had a maximum surface speed of 18.5 knots (34.3 km/h; 21.3 mph) and a submerged speed of 8 knots (15 km/h; 9.2 mph). When submerged, she could operate at 3 knots (5.6 km/h; 3.5 mph) for 90 nautical miles (170 km; 100 mi) or at 8 knots (15 km/h; 9.2 mph) for 16 nautical miles (30 km; 18 mi). When surfaced, she was able to travel 15,200 nautical miles (28,200 km; 17,500 mi) at 10 knots (19 km/h; 12 mph) or 10,500 nautical miles (19,400 km; 12,100 mi) at 11 knots (20 km/h; 13 mph). She was fitted with ten 21 inches (530 mm) torpedo tubes, one QF 4 inch naval gun Mk XXIII, one Oerlikon 20 mm cannon, and a .303 British Vickers machine gun. Her torpedo tubes were fitted to the bow and stern, and she could carry twenty torpedoes. Her complement was sixty-one crew members.

== Publications ==
- Colledge, J. J.; Warlow, Ben (2006) [1969]. Ships of the Royal Navy: The Complete Record of All Fighting Ships of the Royal Navy from the 15th Century to the Present (3rd Rev ed.). London: Chatham Publishing. ISBN 978-1-86176-281-8. OCLC 67375475.
