= HMS Tiptoe =

British T-class submarine

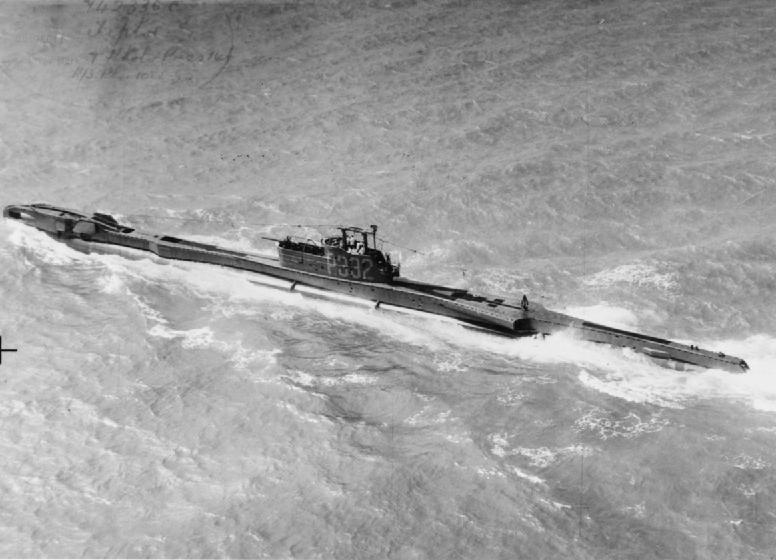
- HMS Tiptoe underway on 3 June 1944

History

United Kingdom
- Name: HMS Tiptoe
- Ordered: 22 December 1941
- Builder: Vickers-Armstrongs, Barrow
- Laid down: 10 November 1942
- Launched: 25 February 1944
- Commissioned: 10 May 1944
- Motto: Per Silentium Persequimur
- Honours and awards: Malaya 1945
- Fate: Sold 1971, scrapped 1975.
- Badge

General characteristics
- Class & type: T-class submarine (Group III)
- Displacement: 1,327 long tons (1,348 t) surfaced; 1,571 long tons (1,596 t) submerged
- Length: 273 ft (83.2 m)
- Beam: 25 ft 6 in (7.8 m)
- Draught: 12 ft 9 in (3.9 m) forward; 14 ft 7 in (4.4 m) aft
- Propulsion: 2 diesel engines 2,500 hp (1,864 kW) each; 2 electric motors 1,450 hp (1,081 kW) each
- Speed: 15.5 knots (28.7 km/h) surfaced; 8.75 knots (16.21 km/h) submerged
- Range: 4,500 nmi (8,334 km; 5,179 mi) at 11 knots (20 km/h) surfaced
- Test depth: 350 ft (107 m) max
- Complement: 63
- Armament: 6 internal forward-facing 21 in (533 mm) torpedo tubes; 2 external forward-facing torpedo tubes; 2 external amidships rear-facing torpedo tubes; 1 external rear-facing torpedo tubes; 6 reload torpedoes; QF 4 in (102 mm) deck gun; 3 anti-aircraft machine guns

HMS Tiptoe (pennant number P332) was a British submarine of the third group of the T class. She was built by Vickers-Armstrongs, Barrow, and launched on 25 February 1944. She was one of two submarines named by Winston Churchill, and so far has been the only ship of the Royal Navy to be named Tiptoe. In 1955 she was involved in a collision with a coastal steamer whilst in Tromsø harbour. She was involved in escape trials off Malta in 1962, and the commanding officer was reprimanded in 1964 following an incident in the Firth of Clyde where she was run aground, and again in 1965 when she collided with HMS Yarmouth. Although originally named for the ability to sneak up on someone undetected, she maintained several links with ballet, including the Royal Ballet and ballet dancer Moira Shearer. She was scrapped at Portsmouth in 1975, while her anchor is on display in Blyth, Northumberland.

== Design and description ==
HMS Tiptoe was one of the group three of T-class submarines. She was named by Winston Churchill, with the intention to imply that it could approach the enemy silently as if on tiptoe, although the Royal Navy naming committee was against the name, stating that "it was derogatory to one of His Majesty's ships", but the Prime Minister had his way. The only other Royal Navy vessel to be named by Churchill was HMS Varangian.

She was part of the second batch of the third group to be ordered, in 1941. She was one of a number of boats which had an all-welded hull which increased diving depth to 350 feet (107 m), an increase of 50 feet (15 m). The torpedo armament was the same as the earlier group two, although by the time group three was coming into service it was realised that external torpedo tubes had major problems and affected the streamlining of the boats; the external tubes were abandoned in the following Amphion-class submarines. Because of expected use in tropical climates, boats of group three were equipped with freon blowers in order to deal with the increased temperatures.

She was built by Vickers-Armstrongs and was laid down at their shipyard at Barrow-in-Furness on 10 November 1942 whilst still known as P332. Following her launch on 25 February 1944, she departed the builders yard on 10 June 1944, arriving at Holy Loch on the following day, where she was commissioned on 12 June.

== Service ==
=== Second World War ===
After completing training on 10 September, she returned to Barrow in order to correct some defects. Between 5 October and 12 January 1944, she was equipped with new radar equipment and other equipment to prepare her for deployment in the Far East. She arrived in Trincomalee, Sri Lanka on 1 March 1945 prior to her first war patrol. En route from Britain, she had stopped at Gibraltar, Malta, Port Said and Ismailia in Egypt and Aden, Yemen.

Her first patrol centred around the west coast of Burma and the Andaman Islands before heading onto Fremantle, Australia, and was uneventful. She departed Australia for her second patrol on 6 May with orders to patrol the Flores Sea. On 15 May, she sank a Japanese coaster of around 100 tons with gunfire near Dompo Bay, Sumbawa. The following day she sank another Japanese coaster with gunfire, this time around 200 tons, in Sepeh harbour. On 1 June, she approached and sank the Japanese merchant cargo ship Tobi Maru near Matasiri, one of the Laut Kecil Islands. Tiptoe was damaged during the attack as the cargo ship was about to rendezvous with an escort. The escort launched thirteen depth charges, putting all of Tiptoe's torpedo tubes out of action and flooded her sonar equipment. She returned to Fremantle on 17 June, and remained there undergoing repairs until 16 July when she left on her third patrol in the Sunda Strait along with her sister HMS Trump.

On 31 July she attacked two small Japanese vessels, but broke off the attack when an aircraft was sighted. On 2 August, Tiptoe and Trump together destroyed two small vessels totalling 600 tons with gunfire. On 3 August, she carried out a torpedo attack against the Japanese army cargo vessel Tencho Maru whilst it was in a convoy defended by a patrol boat. The final action of Tiptoe's last war patrol was on 9 August, when together with Trump, they destroyed an 800-ton coastal tanker in the northern part of the Sunda Strait. She returned to Fremantle on 21 August 1945.

=== Post war ===
During the royal inspection of the Home Fleet in 1947 by George VI, Tiptoe demonstrated diving and surfacing, along with the firing of her deck gun. In November of the same year, she was part of a group of seven submarines with destroyer HMS Opportune to take part in anti–submarine training over the course of two weeks.

Tiptoe was one of several all-welded T-class submarines rebuilt for greater underwater performance. Extra batteries were installed below the control room and additional electric motors were accommodated by cutting through the pressure hull and adding in a new 20 ft (6 m) hull section inserted aft of the control room. The diesel engines were modified and supercharged with output increased by 300 bhp (224 kW). The gun armaments and external torpedo tubes were removed, and the bow reshaped.

The submarine was used in filming the 1950 film, Morning Departure, a naval film directed by Roy Ward Baker. During the course of filming, the submarine depot ship HMS Maidstone was used as a mother ship for Tiptoe. In 1952 a further cinematic link was made when ballet dancer Moira Shearer presented a pair of size 3.5 satin ballet shoes to Tiptoe that she had worn in the 1948 film The Red Shoes. These are now at the Royal Navy Submarine Museum.

Whilst in Tromsø harbour on 18 July 1955 Tiptoe was damaged when a coastal steamer collided with her. The steamer, a 2,162 GRT vessel called Nordlys, was entering the harbour when she collided with the British destroyer HMS Chevron. The steamer bounced off the destroyer and collided with Tiptoe, snapping her moorings as she was pushed halfway under a wooden quay.

She took part in escape trials in 1962, which were a series of trials conducted off Malta into escape from a submarine at extreme depths. Tests were conducted with men escaping from Tiptoe at depth of up to 233 feet (71 m) with ascent rates of up to 6.6 ft/s (2 m/s). The trials included the use of buoyant ascent suits which involved a suit pulled over the sailor's head which fed them air as they ascended to the surface. For their work in the escape trials, Chief Petty Officer Christopher Crossman was awarded a commendation, and Lieutenant-Commander L. Hamlyn was awarded an OBE.

Following a refit in Portsmouth, Tiptoe went to the Firth of Clyde for working up, arriving on 10 January 1964, when she was ordered not to enter Gareloch due to dense fog. The boat was duly turned around and ran aground on a muddy bank. As the fog cleared it was realised the boat had run aground only 40 yards (37 m) opposite that of the house of the Royal Navy's Captain in Charge for the Clyde area, Captain G. D. Pound. Divers were sent out to assess damage, and after finding none, Tiptoe was refloated on the evening tide and pulled off the shore by two tugboats. The commanding officer at the time was Lieutenant-Commander David Brazier, who was in his first command. He was later ordered to be severely reprimanded for negligence at a court-martial where he pleaded guilty to the charge. His defence statement read, "The ship was not worked up and it was a very green company. Unfortunately he ran into fog. He took all the precautions he considered necessary. Although he had all the theoretical knowledge, he was short of that tangible instinct of which we are all aware."

Tiptoe was also damaged in a collision with HMS Yarmouth on 13 July 1965. Tiptoe was at periscope depth 10 miles (16 km) southeast of Portland Bill. Following the collision, the commanding officer, Lieutenant-Commander Charles Henry Pope was ordered to be severely reprimanded after being found guilty of four out of five counts of negligence.

When she left for her final commission on 24 February 1967, six ballet dancers from the Royal Ballet attended the departure ceremony. At the time she was the oldest submarine in service with the Royal Navy. She attended Portsmouth Navy Days later in 1967.

By the time she was decommissioned in 1969, Tiptoe was the last active T-class submarine in the Royal Navy. As she arrived at Spithead for decommissioning on 29 August 1969, a 13-year-old ballet dancer named Judy Wright danced on her upper deck. She was sold in 1971 and scrapped at Portsmouth in 1975. Her anchor was saved, and was mounted on stone in 1979 in Blyth, Northumberland. The town was used as a training base for submarines during both World Wars. Her oak nameplate, used in port and on ceremonial occasions, was recovered by John Storm (who served as her Leading Telegraphist 1944–45) and is now in the possession of his eldest daughter.

A lifebuoy from Tiptoe was found washed up on Newtown beach, Isle of Wight, in the early 1950s. It was donated to the Royal Navy Submarine Museum in 2019.

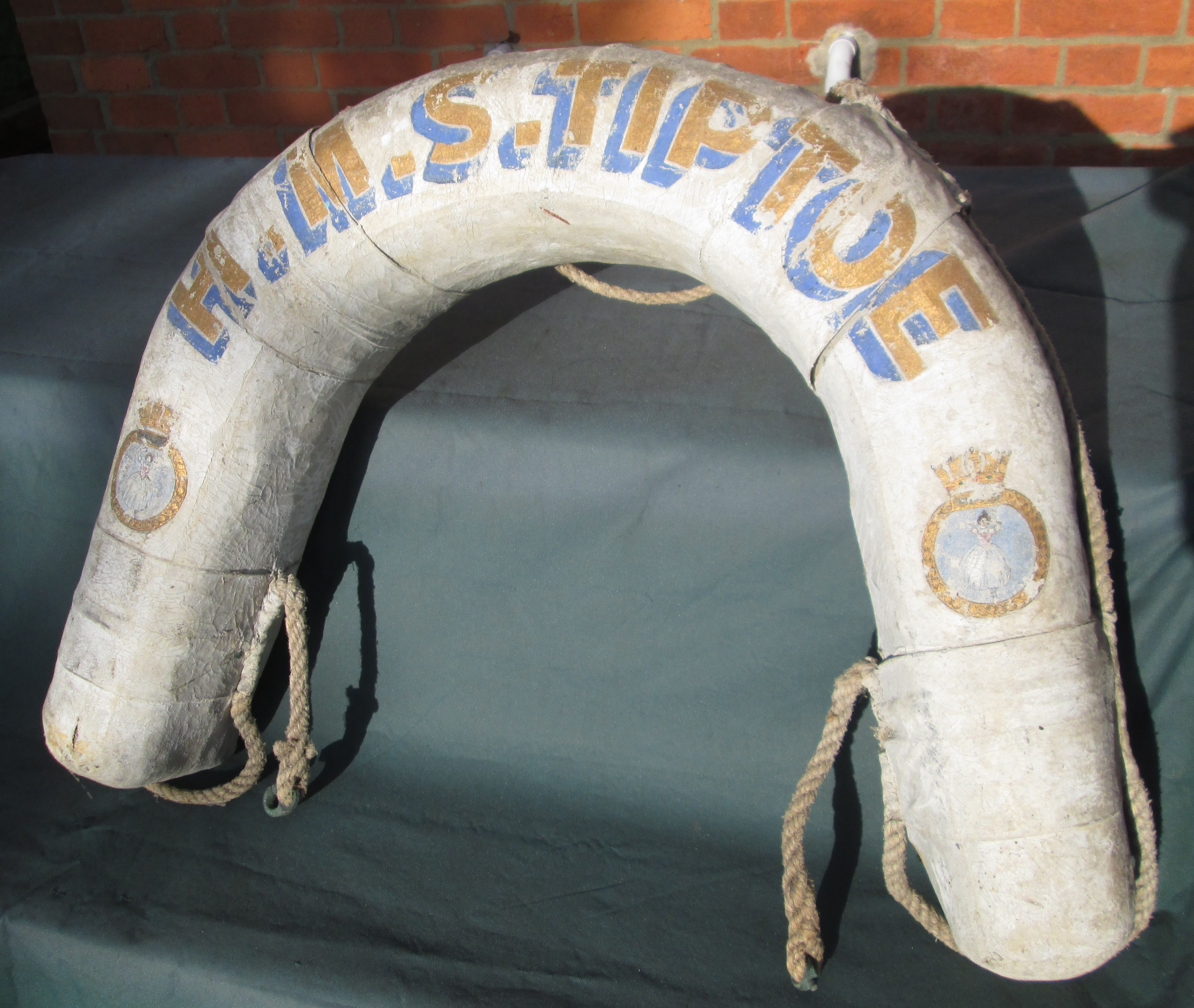
HMS Tiptoe lifebuoy
