= HMS Trump =

T class British submarine

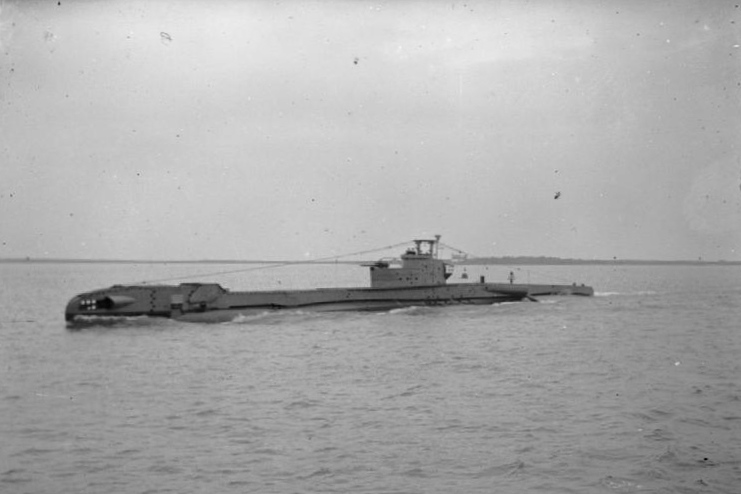
- HMS Trump

History

United Kingdom
- Name: Trump
- Builder: Vickers-Armstrongs, Barrow
- Laid down: 31 December 1942
- Launched: 25 March 1944
- Commissioned: 8 July 1944
- Identification: Pennant number P333
- Honours and awards: Malaya 1945
- Fate: Scrapped at Newport, Wales, August 1971
- Badge

General characteristics
- Class & type: T-class submarine (Group III)
- Displacement: 1,327 long tons (1,348 t) surfaced; 1,571 long tons (1,596 t) submerged
- Length: 273 ft (83.2 m)
- Beam: 25 ft 6 in (7.8 m)
- Draught: 12 ft 9 in (3.9 m) forward; 14 ft 7 in (4.4 m) aft
- Propulsion: 2 diesel engines 2,500 hp (1,864 kW) each; 2 electric motors 1,450 hp (1,081 kW) each
- Speed: 15.5 knots (28.7 km/h) surfaced; 8.75 knots (16.21 km/h) submerged
- Range: 4,500 nmi (8,334 km) at 11 knots (20 km/h) surfaced
- Test depth: 350 ft (107 m) max
- Complement: 63
- Armament: 6 internal forward-facing 21 in (533 mm) torpedo tubes; 2 external forward-facing torpedo tubes; 2 external amidships rear-facing torpedo tubes; 1 external rear-facing torpedo tubes; 6 reload torpedoes; QF 4 in (102 mm) deck gun; 3 anti-aircraft machine guns

HMS Trump (pennant number P333) was a British submarine of the third group of the T class. She was built by Vickers-Armstrongs, Barrow, and launched on 25 March 1944, the only ship of the Royal Navy (RN) to bear the name Trump. She spent the majority of her life attached to the 4th Submarine Squadron based in Australia, the final RN submarine to be posted in Australia. She was kept in service following the war and was refitted for greater underwater performance. She departed from Australia in January 1969, and was sold off and broken up for scrap in August 1971.

== Design and description ==
HMS Trump was one of the T-class, Group Three submarines. She was part of the second batch of the third group to be ordered in 1941. She was one of a number of boats which had an all-welded hull, which increased diving depth to 350 feet (107 m), an increase of 50 feet (15 m). The torpedo armament was the same as the earlier group two, although by the time group three was coming into service it was realised that external torpedo tubes had major problems and affected the streamlining of the boats; the external tubes were abandoned in the following Amphion class. Due to expected use in tropical climates, boats of group three were equipped with freon blowers to deal with the increased temperatures.

== Service ==
=== World War II ===
Trump was commissioned in July 1944. After trials and a work-up in the North Sea in mid-October, she was sent to Perth in Western Australia. On arrival, she joined the 4th Submarine Squadron, supported by the depot ship HMS Adamant. From Perth, Trump carried out four patrols before the end of the war.

During her Far East service, Trump sank the Japanese guard boat No. 15 Shosei Maru on 13 May; a Japanese sailing vessel on 24 May; and two coasters, one on 29 May and the other on 1 June. She sank a tanker on 5 June and, together with her sister boat HMS Tiptoe, she sank a Japanese cargo vessel on 9 August.

Also with Tiptoe, Trump carried out an attack on a Japanese convoy on 3 August. Although it was escorted by a patrol boat, they sank Tencho Maru, an army cargo ship, with the sinking credited to Tiptoe.

=== Post war ===
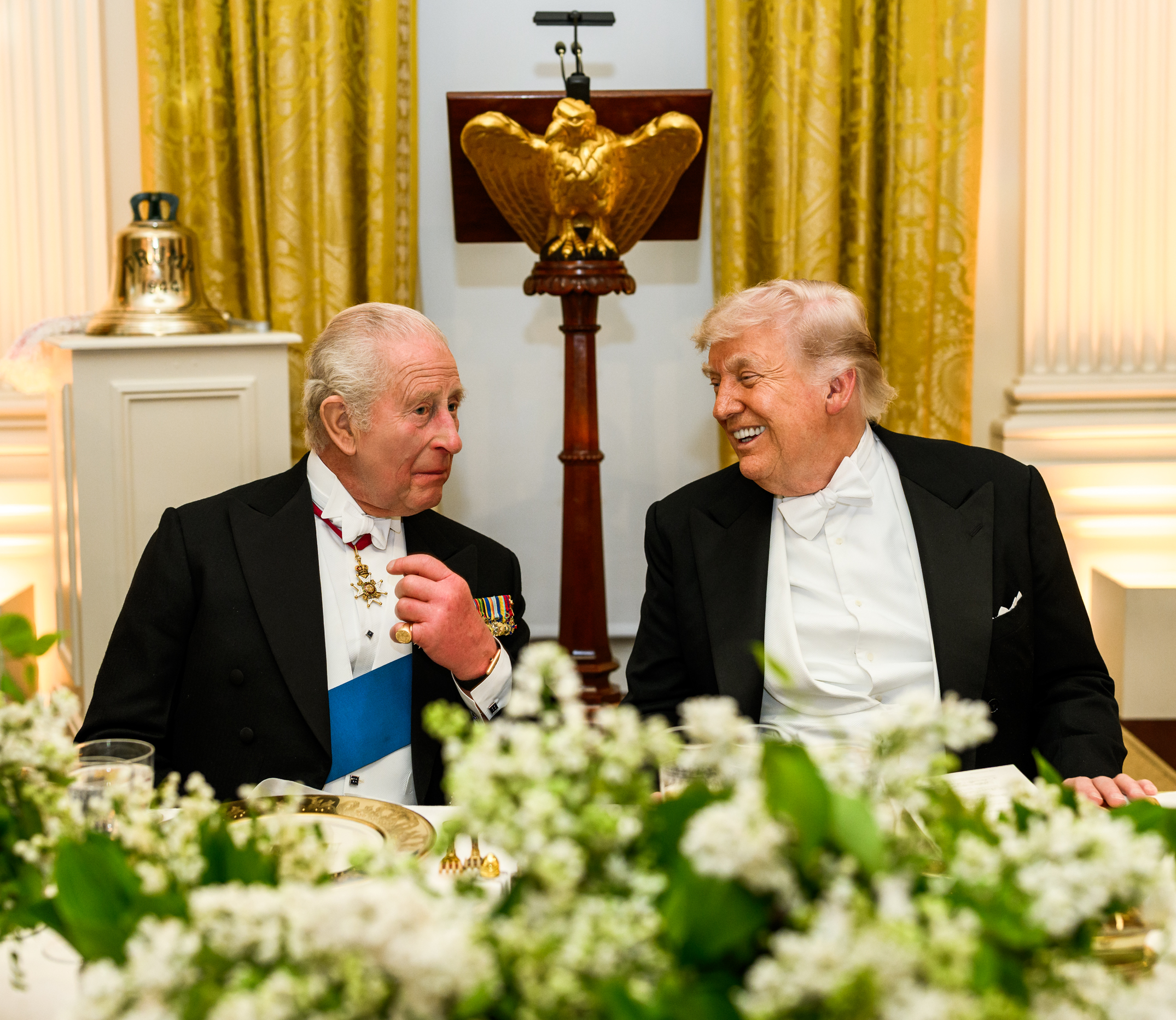
Trump's bell (on pedestal in background) was presented to Donald Trump by Charles III in 2026.

Trump survived the war and continued in service with the Royal Navy. Trump was one of several all-welded T-class submarines rebuilt for greater underwater performance. This "Slippery T" or "Super T" conversion involved the removal of the deck gun and the replacement of the conning tower with a streamlined "fin". Extra batteries were installed below the control room, and additional electric motors were accommodated by cutting through the pressure hull and adding a new 20 ft (6.1 m) hull section inserted aft of the control room. The diesel engines were modified and supercharged, with output increased by 300 brake horsepower (220 kW). The gun armaments and external torpedo tubes were removed, and the bow reshaped. Trump was the last of two submarines, the other being HMS Tabard, which had the bridge incorporated into the added fin section.

In 1960, Trump, along with Taciturn and Tabard, rejoined the 4th Submarine Flotilla at Sydney, Australia, operating with units of the Far East Fleet, the Royal Australian Navy, and the Royal New Zealand Navy. In June 1964, she participated in the "NEWS EX" anti-submarine exercise in the Hauraki Gulf off the coast of New Zealand.

Trump underwent refits at Cockatoo Dockyard between January 1962 and April 1963, and again between August 1965 and October 1966. She was the last Royal Navy submarine to be on station in Australia, departing on 10 January 1969 when the 1st Australian Submarine squadron was formed from the RN 4th Submarine Squadron. Still a Royal Navy submarine, she was temporarily assigned to the Royal Australian Navy while boats of the Oberon class were under construction.

Trump was scrapped at Newport from 1 August 1971.

=== Legacy ===
During his state visit to the United States in April 2026, King Charles III presented the submarine's original bell to the United States president, Donald Trump, and added, "Should you ever need to get hold of us, well, just give us a ring!"
