= HMS Astute (P447) =

Submarine of the Royal Navy

- HMS Astute (P447/S45)

History

United Kingdom
- Name: HMS Astute
- Builder: Vickers Armstrongs
- Laid down: 4 April 1944
- Launched: 30 January 1945
- Commissioned: 30 June 1945
- Fate: Sold for scrap, 1 October 1970

General characteristics
- Class & type: Amphion-class submarine
- Displacement: 1,360/1,590 tons (surface/submerged)
- Length: 293 ft 6 in (89.46 m)
- Beam: 22 ft 4 in (6.81 m)
- Draught: 18 ft 1 in (5.51 m)
- Propulsion: 2 × 2,150 hp (1,600 kW) Admiralty ML 8-cylinder diesel engine, 2 × 625 hp (466 kW) electric motors for submergence driving two shafts
- Speed: 18.5 knots (34.3 km/h; 21.3 mph) surfaced; 8 knots (15 km/h; 9.2 mph) submerged
- Range: 10,500 nautical miles (19,400 km) at 11 knots (20 km/h) surfaced; 16 nautical miles (30 km) at 8 knots (15 km/h) submerged
- Test depth: 350 ft (110 m)
- Complement: 60
- Armament: 6 × 21 inch (533 mm) (2 external) bow torpedo tube, 4 × 21 in (533 mm) (2 external) stern torpedo tube, containing a total of 20 torpedoes; Mines: 26; 1 × 4 in (102 mm) main deck gun, 3 × 0.303 in (7.70 mm) machine gun, 1 × Oerlikon 20 mm gun

HMS Astute (P447) was an Amphion-class submarine. Her keel was laid down by Vickers at Barrow-in-Furness. She was launched in 1944 and commissioned in 1945.

In 1953 she took part in the Fleet Review to celebrate the Coronation of Queen Elizabeth II. Astute was scrapped on 1 October 1970 at Dunston on Tyne.

== Design ==
Like all Amphion-class submarines, Astute had a displacement of 1,360 long tons (1,380 t) when at the surface and 1,590 long tons (1,620 t) while submerged. She had a total length of 293 feet 6 inches (89.46 m), a beam of 22 feet 4 inches (6.81 m), and a draught of 18 feet 1 inch (5.51 m). The submarine was powered by two Admiralty ML eight-cylinder diesel engines generating a power of 2,150 horsepower (1,600 kW) each. She also contained four electric motors each producing 625 horsepower (466 kW) that drove two shafts. She could carry a maximum of 219 tonnes (241 short tons) of diesel, although she usually carried between 159 and 165 tonnes (175 and 182 short tons).

The submarine had a maximum surface speed of 18.5 knots (34.3 km/h; 21.3 mph) and a submerged speed of 8 knots (15 km/h; 9.2 mph). When submerged, she could operate at 3 knots (5.6 km/h; 3.5 mph) for 90 nautical miles (170 km; 100 mi) or at 8 knots (15 km/h; 9.2 mph) for 16 nautical miles (30 km; 18 mi). When surfaced, she was able to travel 15,200 nautical miles (28,200 km; 17,500 mi) at 10 knots (19 km/h; 12 mph) or 10,500 nautical miles (19,400 km; 12,100 mi) at 11 knots (20 km/h; 13 mph). She was fitted with ten 21 inches (530 mm) torpedo tubes, one QF 4 inch naval gun Mk XXIII, one Oerlikon 20 mm cannon, and a .303 British Vickers machine gun. Her torpedo tubes were fitted to the bow and stern, and she could carry twenty torpedoes. Her complement was sixty-one crew members.

Astute was laid down at Vickers-Armstrongs Barrow-in-Furness shipyard on 4 April 1944, was launched on 30 January 1945 and completed on 30 June 1945.

== Service history ==
Astute arrived at Halifax, Nova Scotia on 11 April 1950 for a six-week training period with the Royal Canadian Navy ending on 1 July. Astute spent 21 months in 1955–56 based at Halifax as part of the Canadian submarine squadron, leaving Canada for the UK on 10 December 1956.

As a response to the Cuban Missile Crisis, Astute and sister ship Alderney, both part of the Halifax-based 6th Submarine Squadron, were deployed to the North-East of the Grand Banks to warn if Soviet submarines were to be sent across the Atlantic to Cuba.

== Publications ==
- Blackman, V.B. (1962). Jane's Fighting Ships 1962–63. London: Sampson Low, Marston & Co. Ltd. OCLC 181864290.
- Colledge, J. J.; Warlow, Ben (2006) [1969]. Ships of the Royal Navy: The Complete Record of All Fighting Ships of the Royal Navy from the 15th Century to the Present (3rd Rev ed.). London: Chatham Publishing. ISBN 978-1-86176-281-8. OCLC 67375475.
- Hennessy, Peter; Jinks, James (2016). The Silent Deep: The Royal Navy Submarine Service since 1945. Penguin. ISBN 978-0-241-95948-0.
