= HMAS Otway (S 59) =

1968–1994 Oberon-class submarine of the Royal Australian Navy

Coordinates: 35.71824°S 147.316977°E

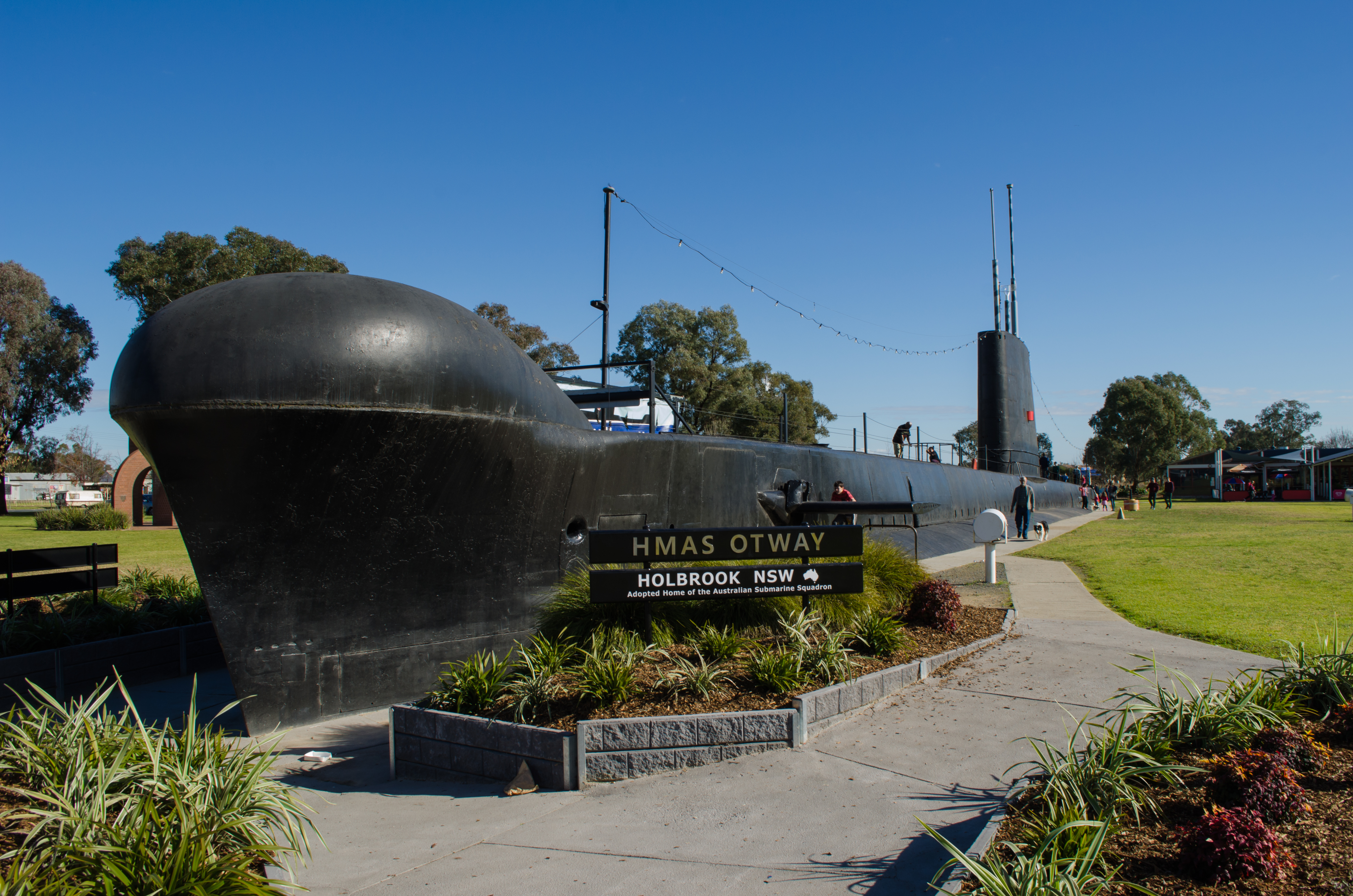
- The casing and fin of HMAS Otway, at Holbrook, New South Wales

History

Australia
- Builder: Scotts Shipbuilding and Engineering Company
- Laid down: 29 June 1965
- Launched: 29 November 1966
- Commissioned: 23 April 1968
- Decommissioned: 17 February 1994
- Fate: Monument at Holbrook, NSW

General characteristics
- Class & type: Oberon-class submarine
- Displacement: 1,610 tons standard; 2,030 tons surfaced; 2,410 tons submerged
- Length: 295.2 ft (90.0 m)
- Beam: 26.5 ft (8.1 m)
- Draught: 18 ft (5.5 m)
- Propulsion: 2 × Admiralty Standard Range supercharged V16 diesel generators; 2 × English Electric motors; 3,500 bhp (2,600 kW) 4,500 shp (3,400 kW); 2 shafts
- Speed: 12 knots (22 km/h; 14 mph) surfaced; 17 knots (31 km/h; 20 mph) submerged; 11 knots (20 km/h; 13 mph) at snorkel depth
- Range: 9,000 nautical miles (17,000 km; 10,000 mi) at 12 knots (22 km/h; 14 mph)
- Test depth: 200 metres (660 ft)
- Complement: As launched: 8 officers, 56 sailors; At decommissioning: 8 officers, 60 sailors
- Sensors & processing systems: Sonar: Atlas Elektronik Type CSU3-41 bow array; BAC Type 2007 flank array; Sperry BQG-4 Micropuffs rangefinding array; Radar: Kelvin Hughes Type 1006
- Armament: Torpedo tubes: 6 × 21-inch (53 cm) bow tubes; 2 × short-length 21-inch (53 cm) stern tubes (later removed); 1996 payload: Mix of 20: Mark 48 Mod 4 torpedoes; UGM-84 Sub Harpoon missiles

HMAS Otway (S 59) was an Oberon-class submarine of the Royal Australian Navy (RAN). One of the first four Oberon-class boats ordered for the RAN, Otway was built in Scotland during the mid-1960s, and commissioned into naval service in 1968. The submarine was decommissioned in 1994. The submarine's upper casing, fin, and stern are preserved at Holbrook, New South Wales.

== Design and construction ==
The Oberon class was based heavily on the preceding Porpoise class of submarines, with changes made to improve the vessels' hull integrity, sensor systems, and stealth capabilities. Eight submarines were ordered for the RAN, in two batches of four. The first batch (including Otway) was approved in 1963, and the second batch was approved during the late 1960s, although two of these were cancelled before construction started in 1969, with the funding redirected to the Fleet Air Arm. This was the fourth time the RAN had attempted to establish a submarine branch.

The submarine was 295.2 feet (90.0 m) long, with a beam of 26.5 feet (8.1 m), and a draught of 18 feet (5.5 m) when surfaced. At full load displacement, she displaced 2,030 tons when surfaced, and 2,410 tons when submerged. The two propeller shafts were each driven by an English Electric motor providing 3,500 brake horsepower (2,600 kW) and 3,500 shaft horsepower (2,600 kW); the electricity for these was generated by two Admiralty Standard Range supercharged V16 diesel generators. The submarine could travel at up to 12 knots (22 km/h; 14 mph) on the surface, and up to 17 knots (31 km/h; 20 mph) when submerged, had a maximum range of 9,000 nautical miles (17,000 km; 10,000 mi) at 12 knots (22 km/h; 14 mph), and a test depth of 200 metres (660 ft). When launched, the boat had a company of 8 officers and 56 sailors, but by the time she was decommissioned, the number of sailors had increased to 60. In addition, up to 16 trainees could be carried.

The main armament of the Oberons consisted of six 21-inch (533.4 mm) torpedo tubes. The British Mark 8 torpedo was initially carried by the submarine; this was later replaced by the wire-guided Mark 23. Between 1977 and 1985, the Australian Oberons were upgraded to carry United States Navy Mark 48 torpedoes and UGM-84 Sub Harpoon anti-ship missiles. As of 1996, the standard payload of an Australian Oberon was a mix of 20 Mark 48 Mod 4 torpedoes and Sub Harpoon missiles. Some or all of the torpedo payload could be replaced by Mark 5 Stonefish sea mines, which were deployed through the torpedo tubes. On entering service, two stern-mounted, short-length 21-inch (53 cm) torpedo tubes for Mark 20 anti-submarine torpedoes were also fitted. However, the development of steerable wire-guided torpedoes made the less-capable aft-firing torpedoes redundant; they were closed off, and later removed during a refit.

Otway was laid down by Scotts Shipbuilding and Engineering Company at Greenock, Scotland on 29 June 1965, The submarine was launched on 29 November 1966 by Princess Marina: the first RAN submarine and second RAN vessel after the cruiser HMAS Canberra to be launched by a member of the Royal Family. In January 1968, RAN personnel sent to Scotland to train before the submarine was completed provided assistance to residents whose houses were destroyed in a storm. Otway was commissioned into the RAN on 23 April 1968.

== Operational history ==
Otway arrived in Australian waters in September 1968 after sailing from the United Kingdom via ports in Africa. During this voyage, the boat became the first RAN vessel to visit Ghana, and the first RAN submarine to round the Cape of Good Hope.

On 10 January 1969, the submarine escorted HMS Trump, the last submarine of the Royal Navy's Australia-based 4th Submarine Squadron, out of Sydney Harbour.

During 1970, the submarine visited New Zealand and was involved in training exercises in the Indian Ocean.

In March and April 1971, Otway participated in SEATO Exercise Subok. On 26 August 1971, Otway's fin was struck by a dummy helicopter-dropped torpedo during training exercises in Jervis Bay. There was only superficial damage to the submarine, which was quickly repaired. On 1 September, the fin was damaged again when a periscope mast was hit by a whale: repairs were completed in Sydney that day. In October, the submarine visited Brisbane for Navy Week, but was forced to sail on short notice and with only two-thirds of her personnel to locate and rescue the crew of the ketch One and All, which had run aground on Middleton Reef.

== Decommissioning and fate ==
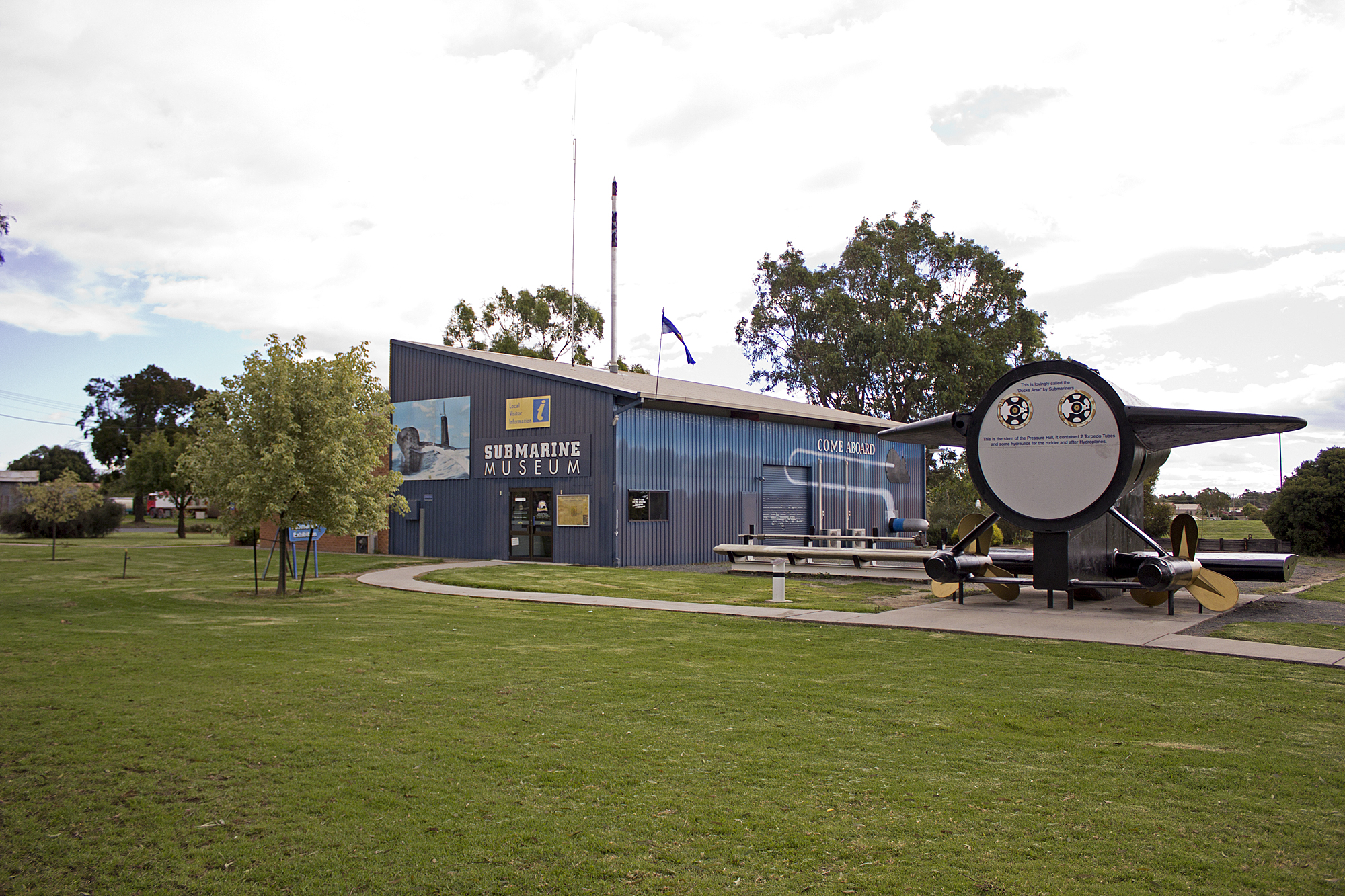
Otway's stern section on display next to the Holbrook Submarine Museum; both located near Otway's landlocked location

HMAS Otway paid off on 17 February 1994. The submarine's fin was donated to the town of Holbrook, New South Wales, an inland community with strong ties to submarines since World War I, when the town was renamed after British submariner and Victoria Cross recipient Norman Douglas Holbrook. The community decided to tender for the purchase of the rest of the submarine, but despite fundraising efforts and a large donation from Holbrook's widow, the town did not win the tender. The submarine was sold to Sims Metal for scrapping in November 1995. Undeterred, the working group created for the tendering process instead used the money raised to buy the upper section of the casing - everything above the waterline when surfaced - plus the submarine's tail section, from Sims Metal.

The casing was sectioned, transported down the Hume Highway on semi-trailers, then reassembled on site with the help of unemployed trainees on a work for the dole scheme. Otway was dedicated as a submarine memorial on 7 June 1997. The Holbrook Submarine Museum was later established nearby.

In 2013, the fin was fitted with periscopes and masts of the type fitted to Otway while in service.
