= HMS Anchorite =

Submarine of the Royal Navy

History

United Kingdom
- Ordered: Very late in World War II
- Builder: Vickers-Armstrongs, Barrow-in-Furness
- Laid down: 13 August 1945
- Launched: 22 January 1946
- Commissioned: 18 November 1947
- Identification: Pennant number P422
- Fate: Sold to be broken up for scrap on 28 July 1970. Scrapped at Troon, Scotland in August 1970.

General characteristics
- Displacement: 1,360/1,590 tons (surface/submerged)
- Length: 293 ft 6 in (89.46 m)
- Beam: 22 ft 4 in (6.81 m)
- Draught: 18 ft 1 in (5.51 m)
- Propulsion: 2 × 2,150 hp (1,603 kW) Admiralty ML 8-cylinder diesel engine, 2 × 625 hp (466 kW) electric motors for submergence driving two shafts
- Speed: 18.5/8 knots (surface/submerged)
- Range: 10,500 nautical miles (19,450 km) at 11 knots (20 km/h) surfaced; 16 nautical miles (30 km) at 8 knots (15 km/h) or 90 nautical miles (170 km) at 3 knots (6 km/h) submerged
- Test depth: 350 ft (110 m)
- Complement: 60
- Armament: 6 × 21 inch (533 mm) (2 external) bow torpedo tube, 4 × 21" (2 external) stern torpedo tube, containing a total of 20 torpedoes; Mines: 26; 1 × 4" main deck gun, 3 × 0.303 machine gun, 1 × 20 mm AA Oerlikon 20 mm gun

HMS Anchorite (P422/S22), was an Amphion-class submarine of the Royal Navy, built by Vickers-Armstrongs and launched 22 January 1946.

== Design ==
Anchorite had a displacement of 1,360 long tons (1,380 t) when at the surface and 1,590 long tons (1,620 t) while submerged. She had a total length of 293 feet 6 inches (89.46 m), a beam of 22 feet 4 inches (6.81 m), and a draught of 18 feet 1 inch (5.51 m). The submarine was powered by two Admiralty ML eight-cylinder diesel engines generating a power of 2,150 horsepower (1,600 kW) each. She also contained four electric motors each producing 625 horsepower (466 kW) that drove two shafts. She could carry a maximum of 219 tonnes (241 short tons) of diesel, although she usually carried between 159 and 165 tonnes (175 and 182 short tons).

The submarine had a maximum surface speed of 18.5 knots (34.3 km/h; 21.3 mph) and a submerged speed of 8 knots (15 km/h; 9.2 mph). When submerged, she could operate at 3 knots (5.6 km/h; 3.5 mph) for 90 nautical miles (170 km; 100 mi) or at 8 knots (15 km/h; 9.2 mph) for 16 nautical miles (30 km; 18 mi). When surfaced, she was able to travel 15,200 nautical miles (28,200 km; 17,500 mi) at 10 knots (19 km/h; 12 mph) or 10,500 nautical miles (19,400 km; 12,100 mi) at 11 knots (20 km/h; 13 mph). She was fitted with ten 21 inches (530 mm) torpedo tubes, one QF 4 inch naval gun Mk XXIII, one Oerlikon 20 mm cannon, and a .303 British Vickers machine gun. Her torpedo tubes were fitted to the bow and stern, and she could carry twenty torpedoes. Her complement was sixty-one crew members.

Anchorite was laid down at Vickers-Armstrongs' Barrow-in-Furness shipyard on 19 July 1945, was launched on 22 January 1946 and completed on 18 November 1947.

== Service ==
During build and before launch the names of Anchorite and HMS Amphion were switched. In 1953 she took part in the Fleet Review to celebrate the Coronation of Queen Elizabeth II.

Anchorite ran aground in Rothesay Bay, Firth of Forth, on 12 October 1956. On 3 October 1960, Anchorite, which was a member of the 4th Submarine Squadron based at Sydney, hit an uncharted rock in the Hauraki Gulf off Auckland, New Zealand at a depth of 110 feet (34 m). No-one was injured in the incident. The submarine's commanding officer, Lieutenant Commander W. L. Owen, was cleared of any blame for the incident to the resulting court martial. The rock is now known as Anchorite Rock on the nautical charts of the area at depth, 16 m, 36°26′S 175°8′E.

== Publications ==
- Blackman, Raymond V. B. (1962). Jane's Fighting Ships 1962–63. London: Sampson Low, Marston & Co., Ltd. OCLC 973779053.
- Colledge, J. J.; Warlow, Ben (2006) [1969]. Ships of the Royal Navy: The Complete Record of All Fighting Ships of the Royal Navy from the 15th Century to the Present (3rd Rev ed.). London: Chatham Publishing. ISBN 978-1-86176-281-8. OCLC 67375475.
- Critchley, Mike (1981). British Warships Since 1945: Part 2. Liskeard, UK: Maritime Books. ISBN 0-9506323-6-8.
