= HMS Achates (P433) =

Submarine of the Royal Navy

History

United Kingdom
- Name: HMS Achates (P433)
- Laid down: 8 March 1944
- Launched: 20 September 1945
- Fate: Expended as a target June 1950

General characteristics if completed
- Class & type: Amphion-class submarine
- Displacement: 1,360/1,590 tons (surface/submerged)
- Length: 293 ft 6 in (89.46 m)
- Beam: 22 ft 4 in (6.81 m)
- Draught: 18 ft 1 in (5.51 m)
- Propulsion: 2 × 2,150 hp (1,600 kW) Admiralty ML 8-cylinder diesel engine, 2 × 625 hp (466 kW) electric motors for submergence driving two shafts
- Speed: 18.5 kn (34.3 km/h) surface, 8 kn (15 km/h) submerged; 10,500 nmi (19,400 km) at 11 kn (20 km/h) surfaced; 16 nmi (30 km) at 8 kn (15 km/h) or 90 nmi (170 km) at 3 kn (5.6 km/h) submerged
- Test depth: 350 ft (110 m)
- Complement: 60
- Armament: 6 × 21 inch (533 mm) (2 external) bow torpedo tubes, 4 × 21 in (2 external) stern torpedo tubes, containing a total of 20 torpedoes; Mines: 26; 1 × 4 in (102 mm) main deck gun, 3 × 0.303 machine gun, 1 × 20 mm AA Oerlikon 20 mm gun

HMS Achates was a planned Amphion-class submarine of the Royal Navy, launched in 1945 but not completed and expended as a target off Gibraltar in June 1950.

== Bibliography ==
- Colledge, J. J.; Warlow, Ben (2006) [1969]. Ships of the Royal Navy: The Complete Record of All Fighting Ships of the Royal Navy from the 15th Century to the Present (3rd Rev ed.). London: Chatham Publishing. ISBN 978-1-86176-281-8. OCLC 67375475.
