= HMS Andrew (P423) =

Submarine of the Royal Navy

History

United Kingdom
- Name: Andrew
- Builder: Vickers Armstrong, Barrow-in-Furness
- Laid down: 13 August 1945
- Launched: 6 April 1946
- Commissioned: 16 March 1948
- Identification: Pennant number P423
- Fate: Sold to be broken up for scrap on 5 May 1977. Scrapped at Plymouth later in 1977.

General characteristics
- Class & type: Amphion-class submarine
- Displacement: 1,360/1,590 tons (surface/submerged)
- Length: 293 ft 6 in (89.46 m)
- Beam: 22 ft 4 in (6.81 m)
- Draught: 18 ft 1 in (5.51 m)
- Propulsion: 2 × 2,150 hp (1,600 kW) Admiralty ML 8-cylinder diesel engine, 2 × 625 hp (466 kW) electric motors for submergence driving two shafts
- Speed: 18.5 knots (34.3 km/h; 21.3 mph) surfaced; 8 knots (15 km/h; 9.2 mph) submerged
- Range: 10,500 nautical miles (19,400 km) at 11 knots (20 km/h) surfaced; 16 nautical miles (30 km) at 8 knots (15 km/h) submerged
- Test depth: 350 ft (110 m)
- Complement: 60
- Armament: 6 × 21 inch (533 mm) (2 external)bow torpedo tube, 4 × 21 in (2 external) stern torpedo tube, containing a total of 20 torpedoes; Mines: 26; 1 × 4 in (102 mm) main deck gun; 3 × 0.303 machine gun; 1 × 20 mm Oerlikon AA gun

HMS Andrew (P423/S23/S63), was an Amphion-class submarine of the Royal Navy, built by Vickers Armstrong and launched on 6 April 1946.

The submarine was fitted with a 4-inch (102 mm) deck gun in 1964 for service during the Indonesia–Malaysia confrontation to counter blockade-running junks. The gun was fired for the last time in December 1974. She was sold off in 1977 and was broken up.

Andrew was briefly the oldest Amphion-class submarine to remain in service, was the last British submarine with a deck gun, was the last British World War II-designed submarine in service, and was the first submarine to use a "snort" to cross the Atlantic (in May 1953).

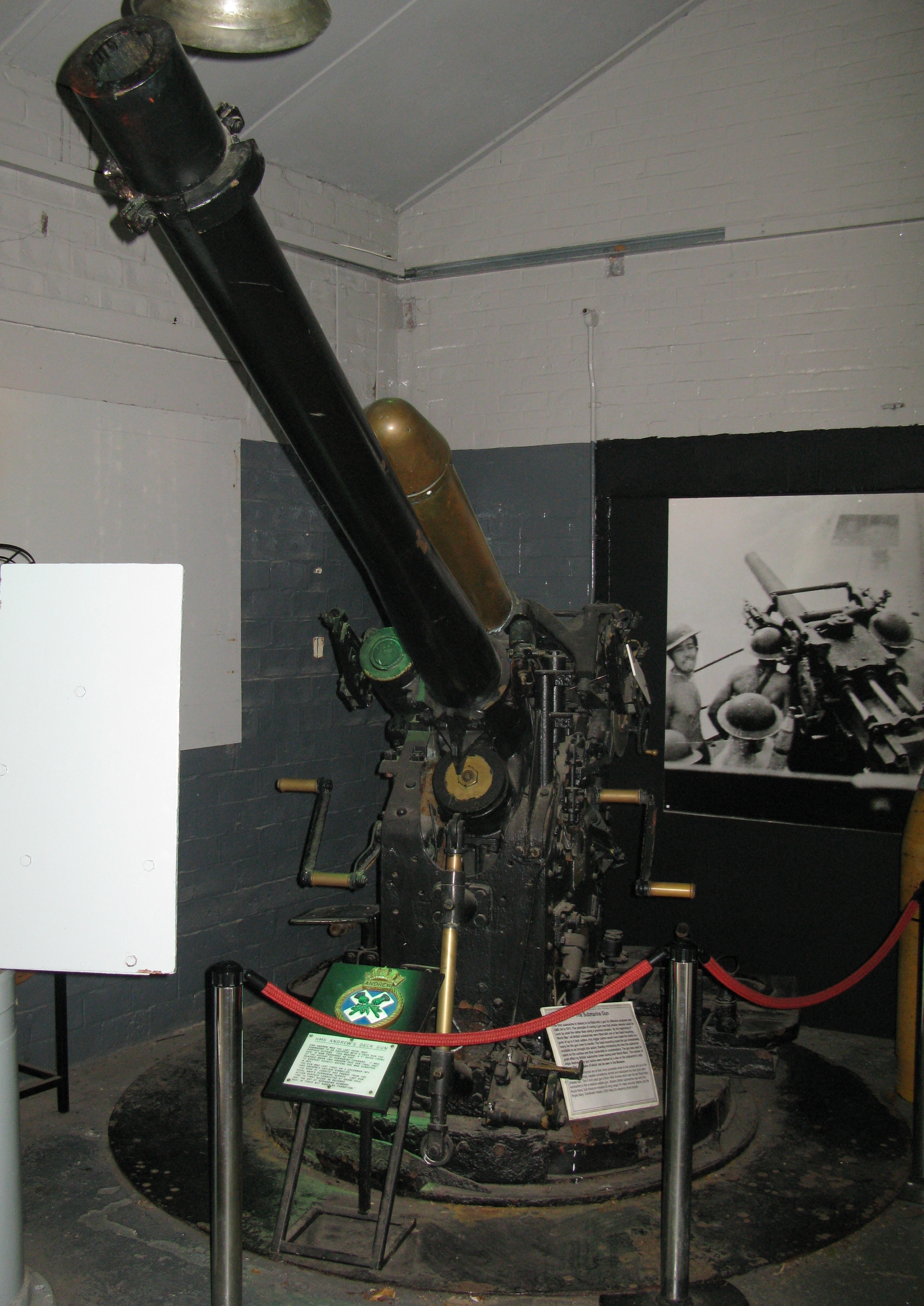
The deck gun from HMS Andrew

== Design ==
Like all Amphion-class submarines, Andrew had a displacement of 1,360 long tons (1,380 t) when at the surface and 1,590 long tons (1,620 t) while submerged. She had a total length of 293 feet 6 inches (89.46 m), a beam of 22 feet 4 inches (6.81 m), and a draught of 18 feet 1 inch (5.51 m). The submarine was powered by two Admiralty ML eight-cylinder diesel engines generating a power of 2,150 horsepower (1,600 kW) each. She also contained four electric motors each producing 625 horsepower (466 kW) that drove two shafts. She could carry a maximum of 219 tonnes (241 short tons) of diesel, although she usually carried between 159 and 165 tonnes (175 and 182 short tons).

The submarine had a maximum surface speed of 18.5 knots (34.3 km/h; 21.3 mph) and a submerged speed of 8 knots (15 km/h; 9.2 mph). When submerged, she could operate at 3 knots (5.6 km/h; 3.5 mph) for 90 nautical miles (170 km; 100 mi) or at 8 knots (15 km/h; 9.2 mph) for 16 nautical miles (30 km; 18 mi). When surfaced, she was able to travel 15,200 nautical miles (28,200 km; 17,500 mi) at 10 knots (19 km/h; 12 mph) or 10,500 nautical miles (19,400 km; 12,100 mi) at 11 knots (20 km/h; 13 mph). She was fitted with ten 21 inches (530 mm) torpedo tubes, one QF 4 inch naval gun Mk XXIII, one Oerlikon 20 mm cannon, and a .303 British Vickers machine gun. Her torpedo tubes were fitted to the bow and stern, and she could carry twenty torpedoes. Her complement was sixty-one crew members.

== Service history ==
In September 1950 Andrew sailed to Canada for a three-month deployment training with the Royal Canadian Navy. In February 1953, Andrew deployed to Bermuda for training with the Royal Canadian Navy cruiser Quebec, destroyer Huron and minesweeper Portage. In June 1953, Andrew became the first submarine to cross the Atlantic submerged for the entire voyage, leaving Bermuda and arriving on 15 June in the English Channel. During the voyage a diesel engine was damaged and a periscope malfunctioned, however both were repaired while submerged. The submarine had been returning from its deployment with the Royal Canadian Navy.

The submarine was used in Port Phillip Bay and tied up in Melbourne to portray the fictional United States Navy nuclear-powered submarine USS Sawfish in the 1959 Stanley Kramer film On the Beach.

== Publications ==
- Colledge, J. J.; Warlow, Ben (2006) [1969]. Ships of the Royal Navy: The Complete Record of All Fighting Ships of the Royal Navy from the 15th Century to the Present (3rd Rev ed.). London: Chatham Publishing. ISBN 978-1-86176-281-8. OCLC 67375475.
