= HMS Tabard =

British T-class submarine

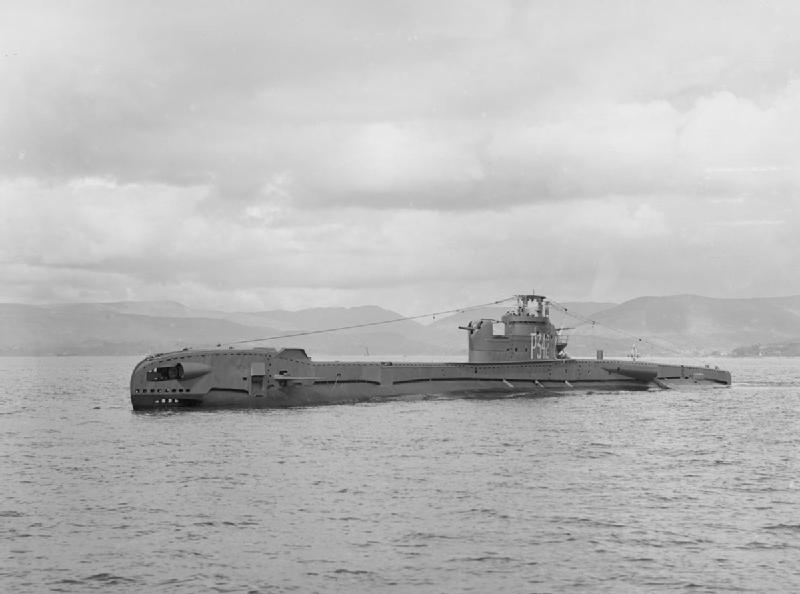
- HMS Tabard, prior to modifications in 1950

History

United Kingdom
- Name: Tabard
- Builder: Scotts Shipbuilding and Engineering Company, Greenock
- Laid down: 6 September 1944
- Launched: 21 November 1945
- Commissioned: 25 June 1946
- Identification: Pennant number: P342
- Motto: My cloak the sea
- Fate: Sold January 1974, scrapped March 1974
- Badge

General characteristics
- Class & type: T-class submarine (Group III)
- Displacement: 1,327 tons surfaced; 1,571 tons submerged
- Length: 273 ft (83 m)
- Beam: 25 ft 6 in (7.77 m)
- Draught: 12 ft 9 in (3.89 m) forward; 14 ft 7 in (4.45 m) aft
- Propulsion: Two diesel engines 2,500 hp (1,900 kW) each; Two electric motors 1,450 hp (1,080 kW) each
- Speed: 15.5 kn (28.7 km/h; 17.8 mph) surfaced; 8.75 kn (16.21 km/h; 10.07 mph) submerged
- Range: 4,500 nmi (8,300 km; 5,200 mi) at 11 kn (20 km/h; 13 mph) surfaced
- Test depth: 350 ft (110 m) max
- Complement: 63
- Armament: 6 internal forward-facing 21 inch (533 mm) torpedo tubes; 2 external forward-facing torpedo tubes; 2 external amidships rear-facing torpedo tubes; 1 external rear-facing torpedo tubes; 6 reload torpedoes; QF 4 inch (100 mm) deck gun; Oerlikon 20 mm cannon

HMS Tabard was a British submarine of the third group of the T class. She was built by Scotts, Greenock, and launched on 21 November 1945. So far she has been the only boat of the Royal Navy to bear the name Tabard, after the item of clothing. Having been launched after the war, she was selected, along with a number of boats of her class, to try out new streamlining techniques based on the German Type XXIII submarine. In May 1963, she was involved in a collision with HMAS Queenborough, and on 10 February 1964 she underwent exercises with HMAS Melbourne and HMAS Voyager in the hours before their collision. When she returned to the UK, she became the static training submarine at the shore establishment HMS Dolphin, until 1974 when she was sold and broken up.

== Design and description ==
Tabard had been originally ordered from Vickers Armstrong, Barrow, but the orders were switched to Scotts Shipbuilding and Engineering Company, Greenock. Ordered as P. 342, she was named Tabard in May 1943 after the tabard, the official dress of a herald, and she is the only boat of the Royal Navy to bear the name. She was laid down on 6 September 1944, and launched on 21 November 1945 before being completed on 25 June 1946. It was one of fourteen boats ordered under the 1942 Programme, and was one of the five which were completed. Unlike some of the earlier boats of its class, it was not equipped with a 4 inch gun with a full shield, rather than a standard open gun mounting. Further aft, she had an Oerlikon 20 mm cannon mounting which was modified for boats by having holes cut in the pedestal for drainage. Being from the third group, she has an all–welded hull, which increased her diving depth to 350 feet (110 m).

Following post war tests by the British Navy on German Type XXIII submarines, it was decided by the Admiralty to modify eight T-class submarines to enlarge the batteries, increase the power of the motors and streamline the hulls. In 1950, Tarbard's pressure hull was cut at the after end of the engine room and the submarine was lengthened by 20 feet (6.1 m). This gave enough room to add an additional battery compartment and a second pair of electric motors. The propulsion system was changed from direct to diesel–electric transmission. Along with HMS Trump, Tabard was one of two boats which were further modified by incorporating their bridge into a streamlined fin. Other streamlining adjustments were made to the hull with all external fittings removed, including the external torpedo tubes and gun. The periscopes, radar masts, snort mast and wireless mast were all incorporated into the new bridge fin.

== Service ==
Tabard was commissioned after the end of the Second World War, initially being sent for Mediterranean duties. In March 1949, she was one of a number of ships to take part in Operation Two Step, a training exercise which combined the bulk of the Home Fleet with the Mediterranean Fleet to make up the biggest concentration of British ships since Operation Torch in November 1942. On 17 January 1950, along with HMS Chequers carrying Prince Philip, Duke of Edinburgh, she escorted HMS Surprise carrying Admiral Sir Arthur Power to meet with Ibn Saud of Saudi Arabia for talks at Jeddah. While being refitted in Malta during June 1950, she was damaged by electrical cables being installed by a disgruntled workman. Reports in the British media arose a little over a month later, mistakenly attributing the damage to HMS Teredo. On 18 December 1950, she rescued Roi Wilson, later captain of the Royal Naval College, Greenwich, after he and his observer James Hawker had downed their Fairey Firefly.

In 1960, Tabard along with Taciturn and Trump, joined the 4th Submarine Squadron in Sydney, Australia. She underwent a refit at Cockatoo Island Dockyard in Sydney between 9 January 1961 and 26 March 1962, becoming the submarine to be refitted there. There, they operated with units of the Far East Fleet, the Royal Australian Navy, and the Royal New Zealand Navy. In April 1963 she collided with a wharf when docking in Brisbane, damaging her ASDIC sonar equipment. On 8 May, Tabard was involved in a further minor collision with Royal Australian Navy frigate HMAS Queenborough, following a week of anti-submarine training exercises. Tabard was at periscope depth when Queenborough passed above her, bending the submarine's fin and the frigate's keel and port propeller. Both vessels were able to safely return to Sydney, where they docked at naval base HMAS Kuttabul for repairs.

On 10 February 1964, she participated in anti–submarine exercises with the aircraft carrier HMAS Melbourne and the destroyer HMAS Voyager, finishing at 1800 hours that day. Less than three hours later, Voyager sailed under Melbourne's bow and was cut in two and sunk, killing 82 of her crew in what was to become known as the Voyager Incident. Later that year in June, she participated in the NEWS EX anti–submarine exercise in the Hauraki Gulf off the coast of New Zealand.

She underwent a second refit at Cockatoo Island between 9 October 1964 and 10 December 1965, due to the extensive repairs required to her fin, casings and salt water systems. Following the establishment of the 1st Australian Submarine Squadron in 1967, the 4th Submarine Squadron returned to the UK, however Tabard along with Trump remained behind on loan to the Royal Australian Navy. Tabard returned to the United Kingdom in March 1968. She was permanently moored as a static training submarine at the shore establishment HMS Dolphin from 1969 until 1974, when she was replaced by HMS Alliance.

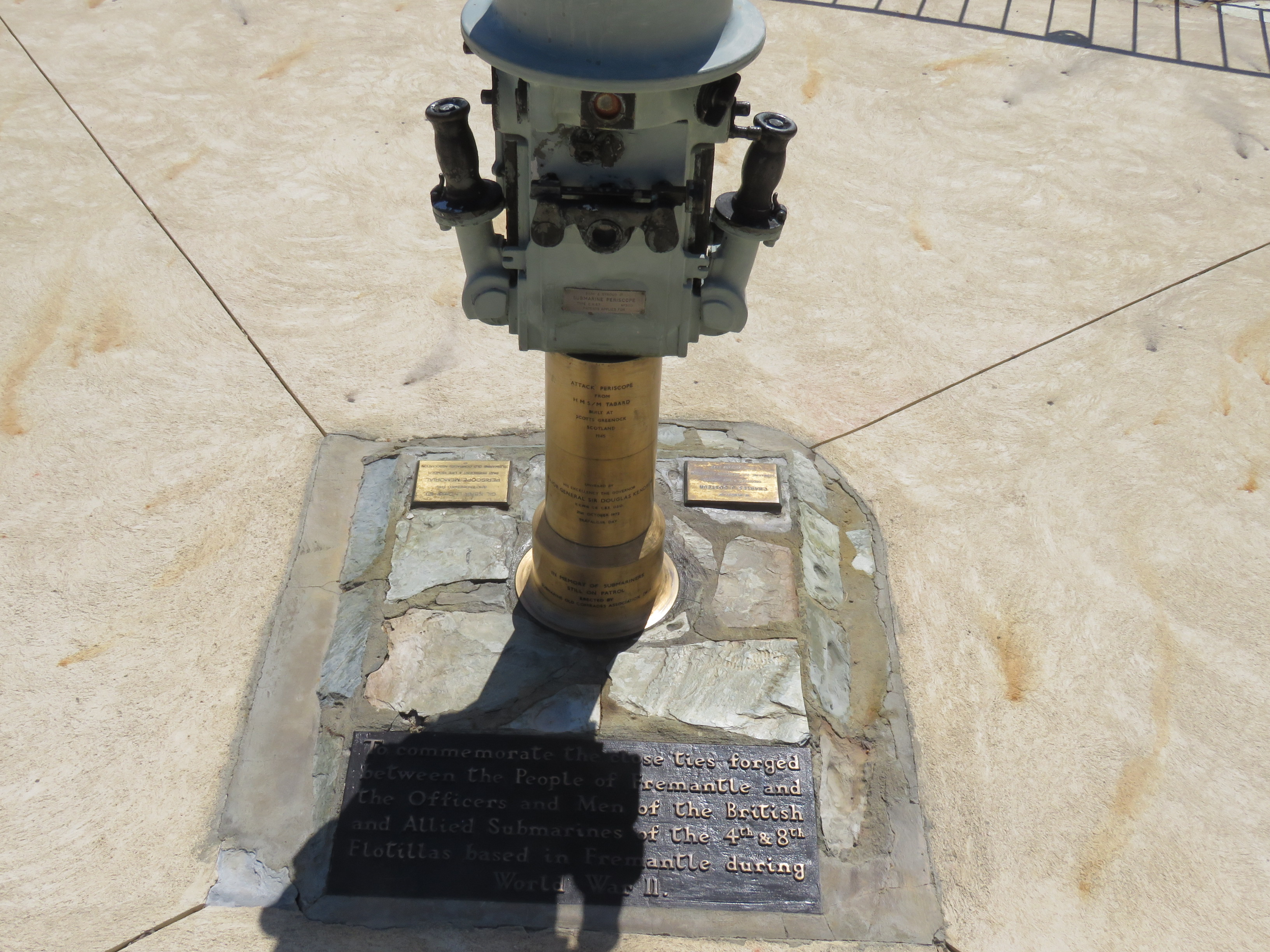
Periscope of HMS Tabard at the Fremantle War Memorial

Tabard was the last T-class boat in service with Royal Navy, albeit non-operationally. She was finally sold for scrap on 2 January 1974, arriving at the breakers on 14 March 1974. During her service, she spent two years in the Mediterranean and eight years in Australia, covering 253,349 miles.
