= Laut Kecil Islands =

Archipelago in the south of Borneo

Laut Kecil Islands is an archipelago in the south of Borneo. Administratively, the islands belong to South Kalimantan province of Indonesia. The main islands include Matasiri, Kalambau, and Kadapongan.
