= Amphion-class submarine =

Class of diesel-electric submarines of the Royal Navy

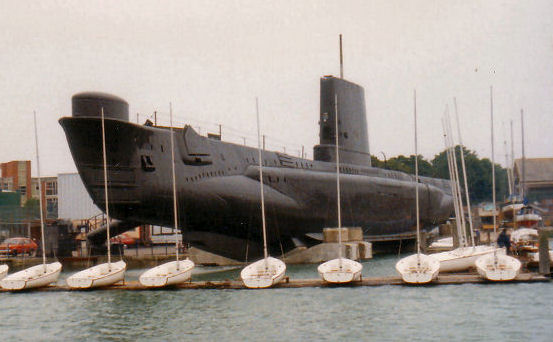
- HMS Alliance at Gosport submarine museum

Class overview
- Builders: Vickers Armstrong, Barrow-in-Furness; Cammell Laird, Birkenhead; Scotts of Greenock; HM Dockyard, Chatham
- Operators: Royal Navy
- Preceded by: V class
- Succeeded by: Explorer class
- In service: 1945 - 1974
- Planned: 46
- Completed: 16
- Canceled: 30
- Preserved: 1

General characteristics
- Type: Submarine
- Displacement: 1,385 tons surfaced, 1,620 tons submerged
- Length: 280.5 ft (85.5 m)
- Beam: 22.3 ft (6.8 m)
- Draught: 16.8 ft (5.1 m)
- Speed: 18.5 knots (34.3 km/h) surfaced; 8 knots (15 km/h) submerged
- Range: 10,500 nautical miles (19,400 km) at 11 knots (20 km/h) surfaced; 16 nautical miles (30 km) at 8 knots (15 km/h) submerged
- Test depth: 500 feet (150 m)
- Complement: 61 officers and men
- Armament: 6 × 21 inch (533 mm) bow torpedo tubes (2 external, one-shot, later removed); 4 × 21 in (533 mm) stern torpedo tubes (2 external, one-shot, later removed); 16 torpedoes or 26 mines carried internally; 1 × QF 4 in (102 mm) gun (Mk XXII or Mk XXIII); 1 × one Oerlikon 20 mm cannon; 3 × .303-caliber machine guns

The Amphion class (also known as the "A" class and Acheron class) of British diesel-electric submarines were designed for use in the Pacific War. Only two were completed before the end of hostilities, but following modernisation in the 1950s, they continued to serve in the Royal Navy into the 1970s.

== Development and service ==
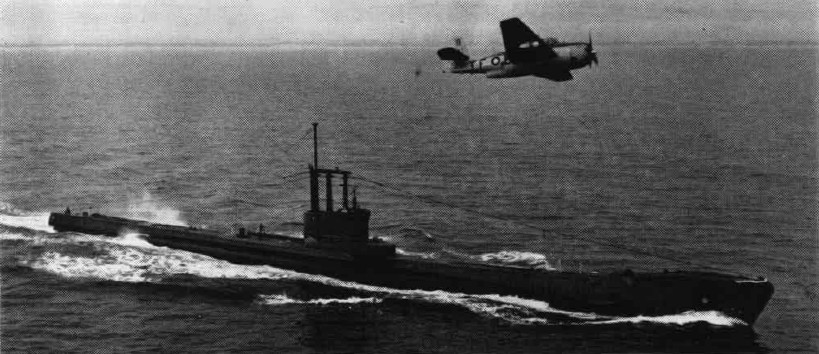
HMS Artful in the mid-1950s, showing the original profile of the class before they were reconstructed.

The Amphion class were ordered by the British Admiralty in 1943, upon the realisation that the new Pacific theatre of war following the attack on Pearl Harbor needed a new type of submarine. They were originally designed to replace the S-class and T-class submarines, which were too slow and unable to dive deep enough to be suited to Pacific waters during World War II. They were essentially the same size as the T class, arranged for fast, simple construction and to utilize much of the materials and equipment set aside for the T boats. They had a high, flared bow for excellent sea performance and had effective air conditioning, essential for Far East submarine operations. They were operated by a crew of between 60 and 68.

Originally, 46 submarines were ordered, but only 18 were launched (10 by Vickers-Armstronsg in Barrow-in-Furness) and 16 commissioned, the other two hulls being used for crush testing. The class was designed for quick construction, using an entirely welded hull which could be fabricated in sections, a technique new to Britain but standard for Nazi Germany's U-boats. Each submarine took about 8 months from keel-laying to launching, compared with around 15 months for the earlier T class, but only two of the boats were completed before the end of the war: Amphion, launched in August 1944, and Astute in January 1945; neither saw action.

The Amphion class was one of only two new British submarine designs produced during World War II, the other being the X-craft 4-man submarines. Wartime experience had shown that submarines had to operate further from the United Kingdom and with larger patrol areas than had been foreseen—in the Far East and Mediterranean for example—so the faster and slightly larger A class was designed to have a longer range than the T class, with accommodation suitable for longer missions.

After World War II various modifications were made to these Overseas Patrol Submarines, as they were known. A snort mast based on the schnorkel used by U-boats during the war, a radar which could be used from periscope depth, and a night periscope were added to the A- and surviving T-class submarines.

In response to the start of the Cold War in the early 1950s their target changed from surface ships to Soviet submarines. In January 1948 the primary operational function of the British submarine fleet was announced to be interception of Soviet submarines slipping out of their bases in Northern Russia, potentially to attack British and Allied merchant vessels. The following April Assistant Chief of Naval Staff Rear-Admiral Geoffrey Oliver circulated a paper in which he proposed that British submarines take a more offensive role, attacking Soviet submarines off the Northern Russian coast and mining the waters in the area. With the dramatically reduced surface fleet, he commented that this was one of the few methods the Royal Navy had for "getting to the enemy on his home ground".

The A and T classes were refitted for their new role between 1955 and 1960 with a complete rebuild of the forward and after hull section, lengthening and streamlining of the upper decks and conning towers, removal of deck guns to improve underwater speed and noise, removal of external torpedo tubes, and greatly improved sonar. When Affray was lost in 1951 all the Amphion class were briefly confined to port pending investigation into her loss.

During the Indonesia–Malaysia confrontation in the mid-1960s, some Amphion-class submarines were fitted with either a QF 4-inch Mk XXIII gun or a single 20mm autocannon to counter blockade running junks. They were the last British submarines to carry a deck gun.

The Amphion class served the Royal Navy for almost three decades as the backbone of the Royal Naval Submarine Service, and was gradually replaced with the Porpoise and Oberon patrol classes that began to be phased in during 1958. The last operational Amphion-class boat, Andrew, was decommissioned in 1974.

== Boats ==
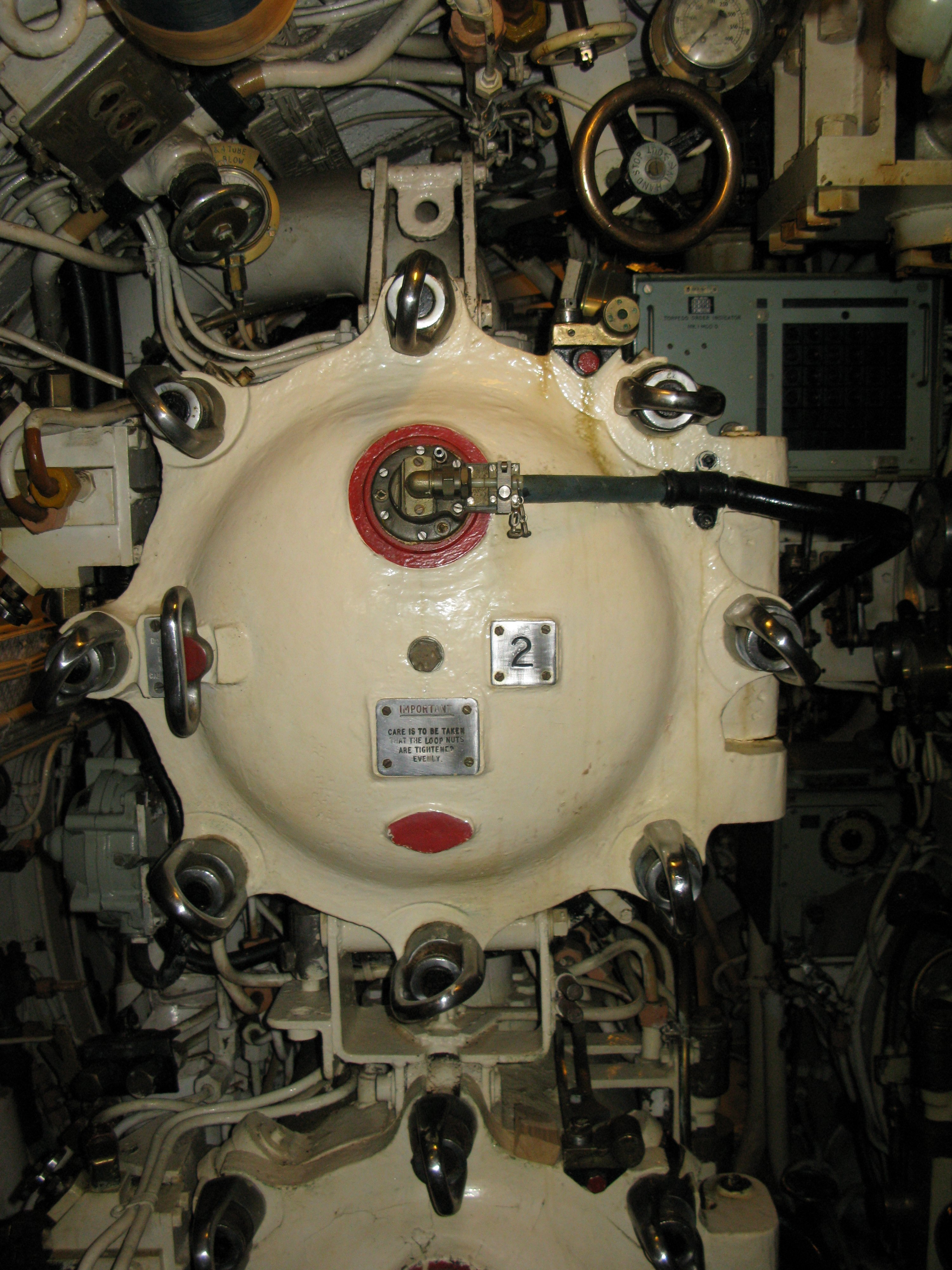
A torpedo tube on HMS Alliance

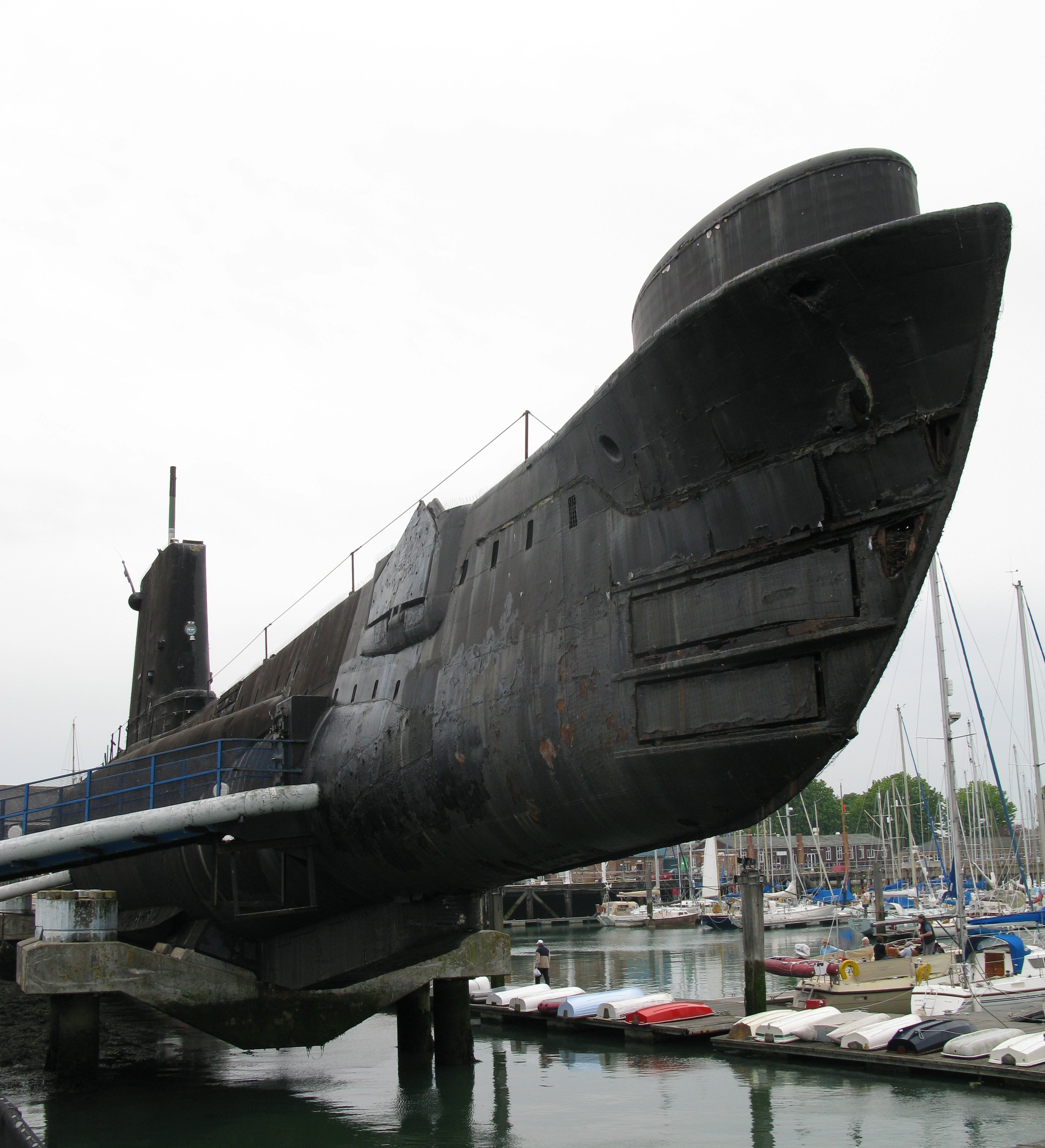
HMS Alliance in 2008

=== Built at Vickers-Armstrong, Barrow-in-Furness ===
- Amphion (P439/S39/S43) (laid down as Anchorite but name changed before launch)
- Astute (P447/S47/S45)
- Auriga (P419/S19/S69)
- Aurochs (P426/S26/S62)
- Alcide (P415/S15/S65)
- Alderney (P416/S16/S66)
- Alliance (P417/S17/S67) (now at Royal Navy Submarine Museum, Gosport)
- Ambush (P418/S18/S68)
- Anchorite (P422/S22/S64) (originally laid down as Amphion but name changed before launch)
- Andrew (P423/S23/S63)

=== Built at Cammell Laird, Birkenhead ===
- Affray (P421) (the last British submarine lost at sea)
- Aeneas (P427/S27/S72/SSG72)
- Alaric (P441/S41)

=== Built at Scotts Shipbuilding and Engineering Company of Greenock ===
- Artemis (P449/S39/S49)
- Artful (P456/S56/S96)

=== Built at HM Dockyard, Chatham ===
- Acheron (P411/S11/S61)

=== Built at HM Dockyard, Plymouth ===
These were the two vessels which were launched but not completed.

- Ace (P414)
- Achates (P433)

=== Cancelled orders ===
In 1945, besides the two vessels at Devonport, the following orders were cancelled:

Vickers-Armstrongs, Barrow-in-Furness;

- HMS Andromache (P424)
- HMS Answer (P425)
- HMS Antagonist (P428)
- HMS Antaeus (P429)
- HMS Anzac (P431)
- HMS Aphrodite (P432)
- HMS Approach (P435)
- HMS Arcadian (P436)
- HMS Ardent (P437)
- HMS Argosy (P438)
- HMS Atlantis (P442)

Vickers-Armstrongs, Walker-on-Tyne;

- HMS Admirable (P434)
- HMS Asperity (P444)
- HMS Austere (P445)
- HMS Adversary (P457)
- HMS Awake (P459)
- HMS Aztec (P455)

Portsmouth Dockyard;

- HMS Abelard (P451)
- HMS Acasta (P452)

Cammell Laird;

- HMS Agate (P448)
- HMS Aggressor (P446)
- HMS Agile (P443)
- HMS Aladdin (P454)
- HMS Alcestis (P453)

Scotts of Greenock

- HMS Asgard (P458)
- HMS Assurance (P462)
- HMS Astarte (P461)

Chatham Dockyard

- HMS Adept (P412)

== See also ==
- List of ship classes of the Second World War
