= QF 4-inch naval gun Mk XXIII =

Ordnance QF 4 inch gun Mk XXIII
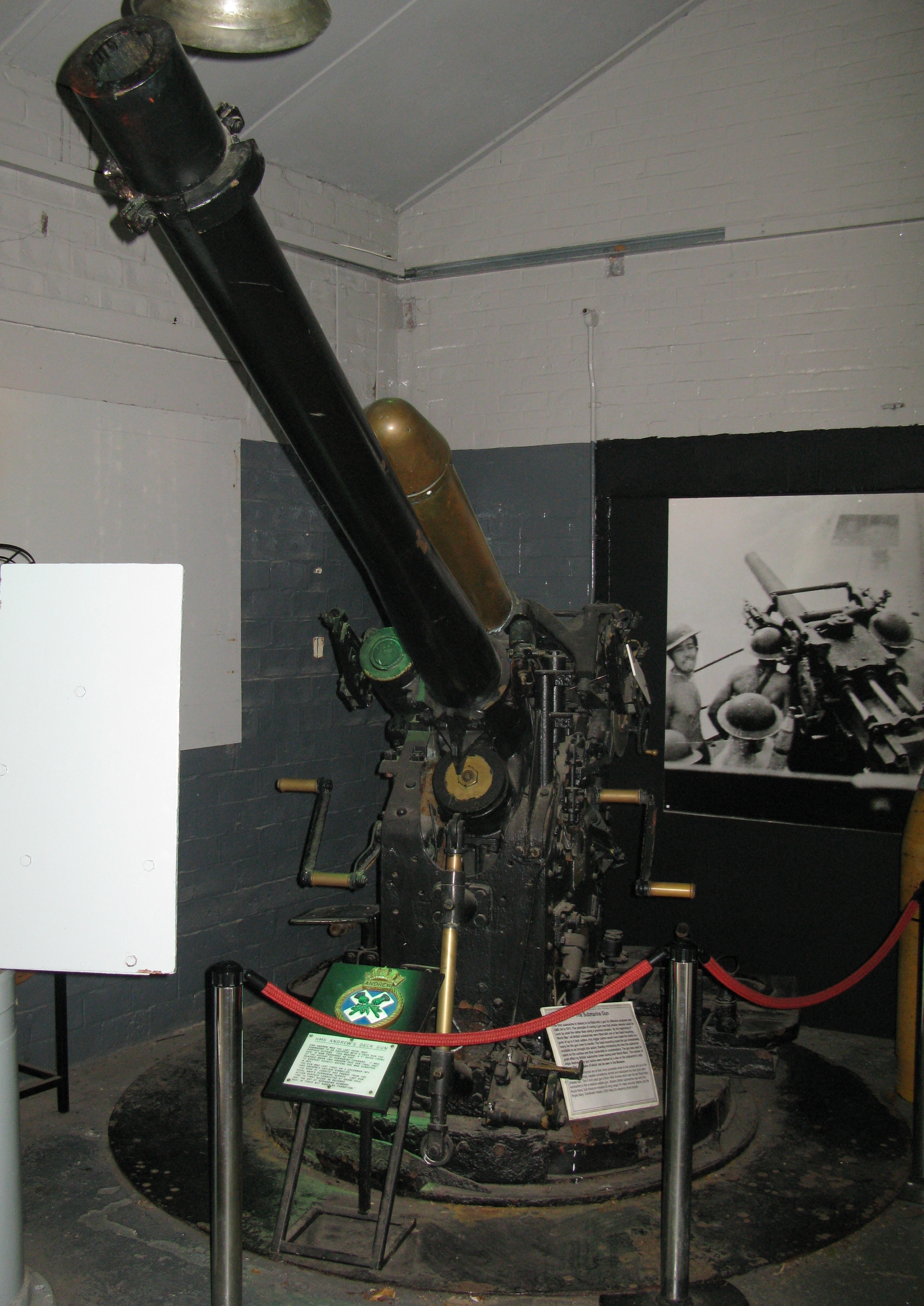
- Mk XXIII gun from HMS Andrew at the Royal Navy Submarine Museum, Gosport.
- Type: Submarine deck gun
- Place of origin: United Kingdom

Service history
- In service: 1945-1974
- Used by: United Kingdom
- Wars: Indonesia–Malaysia confrontation Cold War

Production history
- Produced: 1945-46
- No. built: 31

Specifications
- Mass: 1,568 lb (711 kg) barrel and breech
- Length: 137.6 in (3.495 m)
- Barrel length: 132.2 in (3.358 m) bore (33 calibres)
- Shell: Fixed QF 35 lb (15.9 kg); 38.5 lb (17.5 kg)
- Calibre: 4 in (102 mm)
- Breech: horizontal sliding-block
- Carriage: 4-0 Inch SII Mounting
- Elevation: -10 to +30 degrees
- Traverse: 360 degrees
- Rate of fire: about 15 rounds per minute
- Muzzle velocity: 35 lb: 1,791 ft/s (546 m/s); 38.5 lb: 1,745 ft/s (532 m/s)
- Maximum firing range: 12,080 yd (11.05 km) 35 lb HE shell at 30 degrees:

The QF 4-inch gun Mark XXIII was introduced in late 1945 as a deck gun for Royal Navy submarines. It was the last type of gun to be fitted to British submarines, finally being retired in 1974.

== Development and service ==
Development of the Mark XXIII began in 1942, as a lighter replacement for the QF 4-inch gun Mark XXII, which was based on a gun introduced in 1911. It was too late to see service in World War II, but was fitted to Amphion-class submarines that completed after October 1945. It was also fitted to some T-class submarines.

Between 1955 and the early 1960s, the Amphion-class boats were modernised with new streamlined conning towers and casings. This work included the removal of the deck gun, although the underlying supports for the gun mountings were retained in case they were required. This facility was put to use during the British involvement in the Indonesia–Malaysia confrontation from 1962 to 1966, when the flotilla of Amphion-class submarines which were deployed in the conflict were again fitted with Mark XXIII guns. These were used to counter blockade-running Indonesian junks and other small vessels. HMS Andrew retained her gun into the 1970s; the last firing was on 2 December 1974.

== Surviving examples ==
Very few Mark XXIII guns and their respective SII mountings were produced (only 31 in total), and only two are known to still exist today:

HMS Andrew's Mark XXIII gun is preserved at the Royal Navy Submarine Museum, Gosport.
