= Artemis (disambiguation) =

Artemis (‘Αpteμη) is the ancient Greek goddess of the hunt, the wilderness, wild animals, the Moon, and chastity.

Artemis may also refer to:

== Arts, entertainment, and media ==
=== Fictional entities ===
- Artemis (DC Comics), a goddess in the DC Universe
- Artemis (Marvel Comics), a goddess in the Marvel Universe
- Artemis (Sailor Moon), a cat character in Codename: Sailor V and Sailor Moon
- Artemis (Transformers), a character in Beast Wars II: Super Life-Form Transformers
- Artemis (Devil May Cry), a demon in Devil May Cry 5
- Artemis, a fictional Scottish ship in Diana Gabaldon's Voyager (novel)
- Artemis of Bana-Mighdall, an Amazon superheroine in DC Comics
- Artemis Crock, a supervillain and superhero in DC Comics
- Artemis Entreri, character in the Forgotten Realms campaign setting for Dungeons & Dragons
- Art3mis, a character in Ready Player One
- HMS Artemis, a fictional ship in The Ship by C. S. Forester

=== Literature ===
- Artemis (magazine), a 1902–1903 Armenian women's literary magazine
- Artemis (novel), a 2017 novel by Andy Weir
- Artemis, a 2002 novel in the Thomas Kydd series by Julian Stockwin
- Artemis Fowl, a series of books by Eoin Colfer
  - Artemis Fowl (novel), the first novel in the series

=== Other uses in arts, entertainment, and media ===
- Artemis Fowl (film), 2020 film adaptation of the 2001 novel
- Artemis: Spaceship Bridge Simulator, a spaceship bridge simulation game
- Artemis (album), a 2019 album by Lindsey Stirling
- "Artemis" (song), a 2019 song by Lindsey Stirling and title track for the above album
- "Artemis", a song by Aurora, from the album The Gods We Can Touch
- Artemis (band), a jazz collective founded by Renee Rosnes
- Fly Me to the Moon (2024 film), a romantic comedy film originally titled Project Artemis

== Organizations and enterprises ==
- Artemis (brothel), a large brothel in Berlin, Germany
- Artemis (fund managers), a UK-based investment management firm
- Artemis Networks, a wireless technology company
- Artemis Racing, a professional sailing team
- Artemis Records, a New York-based independent record label
- Artemis Rising Foundation, a nonprofit organization and film production and television production company
- Artemis Technologies, applied technologies company
- Groupe Artémis, a French holding company

== Military ==
- Artemis 30, an anti-aircraft gun
- Operation Artemis, a 2003 military operation in the Democratic Republic of the Congo
- Project Artemis, a 1960s U.S. Navy project to produce a long-range sonar system
- Aerial Reconnaissance and Targeting Exploitation Multi-Mission Intelligence System (ARTEMIS), a U.S. Army contractor-owned/contractor-operated aircraft based on the Bombardier Challenger 600 series

== People ==
- Artemisia I of Caria (fl. 480 BCE), ancient Anatolian/Greek queen and naval commander
- Artimus Parker (1952–2004), American football player
- Artemis Pebdani (born 1977), American actress
- Artimus Pyle (born 1948), drummer for the band Lynyrd Skynyrd
- Virginia Hall (1906–1982), a Special Operations Executive nicknamed Artemis by the Germans

== Places ==
=== Terrestrial ===
- Artemis (island), near Crete, Greece
- Artemida, Attica, a suburban town in east Attica, Greece
- Artemus, Kentucky, United States

=== Extraterrestrial ===
- Artemis (crater), a lunar crater
- 105 Artemis, an asteroid
- Artemis Chasma, a large chasma or depression on Venus
- Artemis Corona, the largest corona on Venus

== Science and technology ==
=== Biology ===
- Artemis, the founder of a line of transgenic goats producing human lysozyme
- Artemis, a protein encoded by the human gene DCLRE1C
- Artemis complex, a protein complex involved in immunological diversity

=== Computing ===
- Apache ActiveMQ Artemis, a next generation messaging broker that is designed to replace ActiveMQ Classic.
- Artemis (software), a software package for project management
- Generic!Artemis, a computer virus
- HTC Artemis, a Windows Mobile PDA/phone

=== Spaceflight ===
- ARTEMIS, NASA probes ARTEMIS-P1 and ARTEMIS-P2
- Artemis (satellite), a geostationary communications satellite
- ARTEMIS, a hyperspectral imager aboard the TacSat-3 satellite
- Artemis Accords, an agreement on the principles for cooperation in the civil exploration and use of the Moon, Mars, comets, and asteroids for peaceful purposes
- Artemis program, a NASA-led lunar exploration program
- Artemis Project, a now-cancelled private venture to establish a lunar community

== Ships ==
- Artemis (barque), sailing ship built in 1926
- French ship Artémis, the name of several ships
- HMS Artemis (P449), a British Royal Navy submarine built in 1946
- HSwMS Artemis, Swedish Navy signals intelligence gathering vessel
- MV Artemis, the name of several motor vessels
- SS Artemis, the name of several steamships
- USS Artemis, the name of several ships of the United States Navy

== Other uses ==
- Eterniti Artemis, a car built by Eterniti Motors
- Operation Artemis, an Australian law enforcement crack down of the Child's Play child sexual abuse web site

== See also ==
- Artemas (disambiguation)
- Artemesia (disambiguation)
- Artemisa (disambiguation)
- Artemisia (disambiguation)
- Artemiz (disambiguation)
- Artemus (disambiguation)
- Arthemis
- Artms
- Arty (disambiguation)
