= Artemas =

Artemas may refer to:

== People ==
=== Government and politics ===
- Artemas Killian Callahan (1904–2001), member of the Alabama House of Representatives
- Artemas Hale (1783–1882), U.S. Representative from Massachusetts
- Artemas Libbey (1823–1894), member of the Maine House of Representatives and justice of the Maine Supreme Judicial Court
- Artemas Ward (1727–1800), American Revolutionary War general and U.S. Representative from Massachusetts
- Artemas Ward Jr. (1762–1847), son of Artemas Ward, also a U.S. Representative from Massachusetts
- Artemas Leslie, American lawyer

=== Religion ===
- Artemas (saint), Saint Artemas of Lystra, a Christian biblical figure
- Artemas of Pozzuoli, 3rd century Christian martyr
- Artemas Wyman Sawyer (1827–1907), American Baptist minister and educator

=== Other fields ===
- Artemas Ward (writer) (1848–1925), American writer, great-grandson and namesake of Artemas Ward (1727–1800)
- Artemas Martin (1835–1918), American mathematician
- Artemas (musician) (born 1999), stage name of English-Cypriot musician Artemas Diamandis

== Other uses ==
- Artemas, Pennsylvania
- Statue of Artemas Ward, a 1936 statue in Ward Circle, Washington, D.C.
- SS Artemas Ward, a U.S. Liberty ship used in World War II

== See also ==
- Artema, a genus of spider in the family Pholcidae
- Artemis (disambiguation)
- Artemus (disambiguation)
