= 6th Submarine Division =

- Active: 1954 – 1967
- Disbanded: 1967
- Country: United Kingdom
- Branch: Royal Navy
- Size: Division
- Garrison/HQ: Halifax, Nova Scotia

6th Submarine Division was a Royal Navy submarine squadron based in Halifax, Nova Scotia and provided training for the Royal Canadian Navy from 1954 to 1967.

== History ==
In 1954 HMS Alderney was sent to Canada to provide submarine training on the Canadian Atlantic coast and one of three British submarines to serve time with the 6th. Canada had submarines in World War I (two CC-class submarines in service from 1914 to 1918) but later disbanded their submarine unit after the acquisition of two British H-class submarines that operated 1918–1922. Post World War II submarine exercises were conducted pitting Royal Canadian Navy surface vessels alongside Royal Navy (RN) submarines in the Atlantic. Beginning in 1957 Canada planned the gradual re-establishment of its own submarine service with the purchase of three Oberon-class submarines from the United Kingdom and leasing an American Balao-class submarine trainer HMCS Grilse (the former USS Burrfish) in 1961 that was assigned to the West Coast.

The division was disbanded in 1967 as the Canadian Oberons order completed by 1965 and the RN closure of submarine overseas units: 5th Submarine in Malta (disbanded 1964), 4th Submarine Division in Sydney, Australia (disbanded 1969), 7th Submarine in Singapore (disbanded 1971).

The First Canadian Submarine Squadron was formed in 1966 by the RCN with assignment for all three Oberons. The Canadian squadron would remain after the Canadian unification of the armed services in 1968 with the submarines operating mostly under either Maritime Forces Atlantic and occasionally with Maritime Forces Pacific. The squadron disbanded in 1996 with submarines assigned to Maritime Operations Group Five.

== Ships ==
A-class submarines were assigned to Halifax:

- HMS Alderney - stationed 3 times from 1954 to 1963
- HMS Astute - stationed 1955 to 1956
- HMS Auriga - stationed 1959 to 1961

== Commanding officers ==
The division's commander reported to Flag Officer Atlantic Coast.

- Commander Stephen Jenner 1960–1963
- Commander Ken Vause 1963–1964
