= Shooting festival =

Gathering, sport competition, festival, tradition

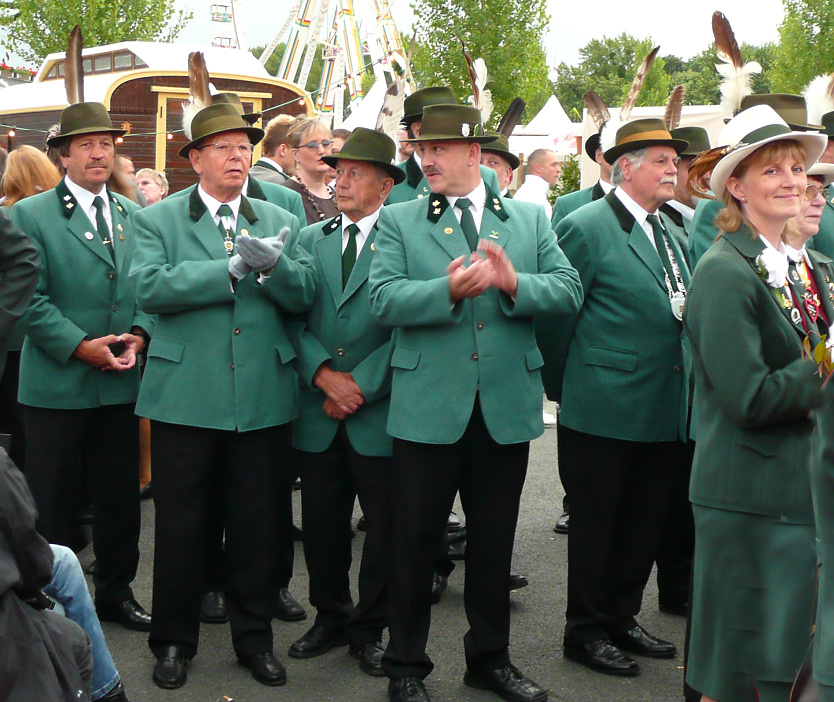
Marksmen at a Schützenfest in Hanover

A shooting festival, Schützenfest (German: [ˈʃʏtsn̩ˌfɛst] in German and koningsschieten or koningsschieting in Dutch, is a traditional festival or fair featuring a target shooting competition. It is a tradition in various European countries including Belgium, Switzerland, Germany, Austria and the Netherlands.

At a shooting festival, contestants compete in various target shooting competitions, such as shooting at a wooden eagle. The competition's winner becomes the "king of marksmen" (Schützenkönig in German and Schutterskoning in Dutch) until the following year's competition.

The commercially-organized Hanover Schützenfest in Germany is the largest marksmen's funfair in the world with more than 7,000 marksmen, 250 rides and inns, five large beer tents, and the "Marksmen's Parade". The parade, with more than 10,000 participants from Germany and all over the world and more than 100 bands, is 12 kilometres (7.5 mi) long. It is the longest parade in the world. The landmark of the funfair is one of the highest transportable big wheels (US = Ferris wheels) in the world. It is 60 metres (200 ft) high and offers seating for 420 people in 42 cabins.

== History in Germany ==
Schützenvereine (associations of marksmen) and Schützenfeste (their festivals) belong to communal life in the Germanic regions of Europe. Their tradition dates back for centuries and has continued to the present day.

The word Schütze means marksman and protector, as contained in "to shield", e.g., a Schutzmann is a German policeman. The pride of strong-armed self-defense underlies the popularity of Schützenvereine comparable to the popularity of volunteer fire brigades, particularly in smaller towns or villages.

The main event of a Schützenfest is the shooting competition to determine the marksmen's king (Schützenkönig) of the following year. The traditional trophy for the winner is an Ehrenscheibe or Königsscheibe, a painted target disk. In rural districts, one finds gables of houses decorated with them.

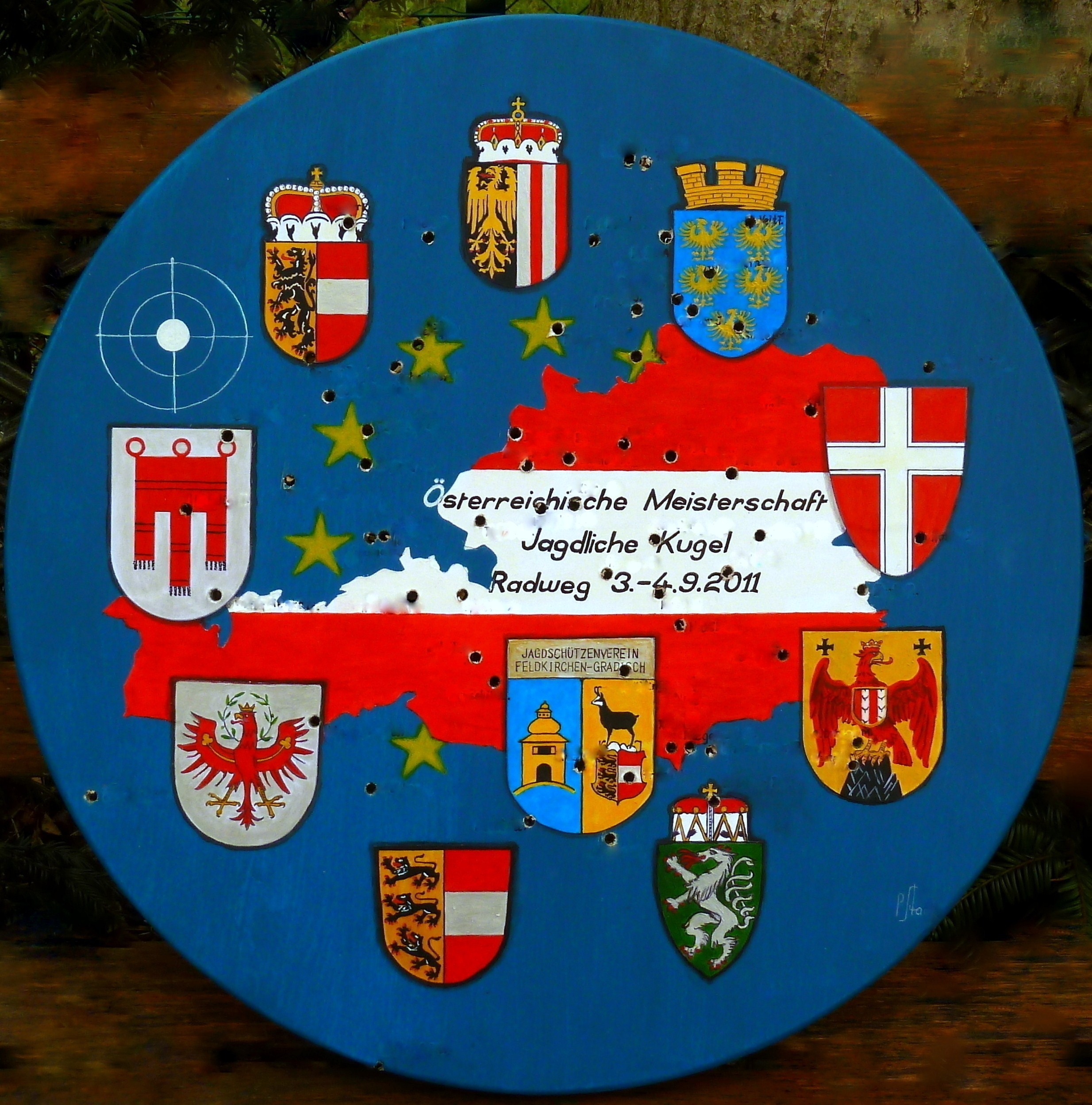
Modern Ehrenscheibe from Austria, 2011

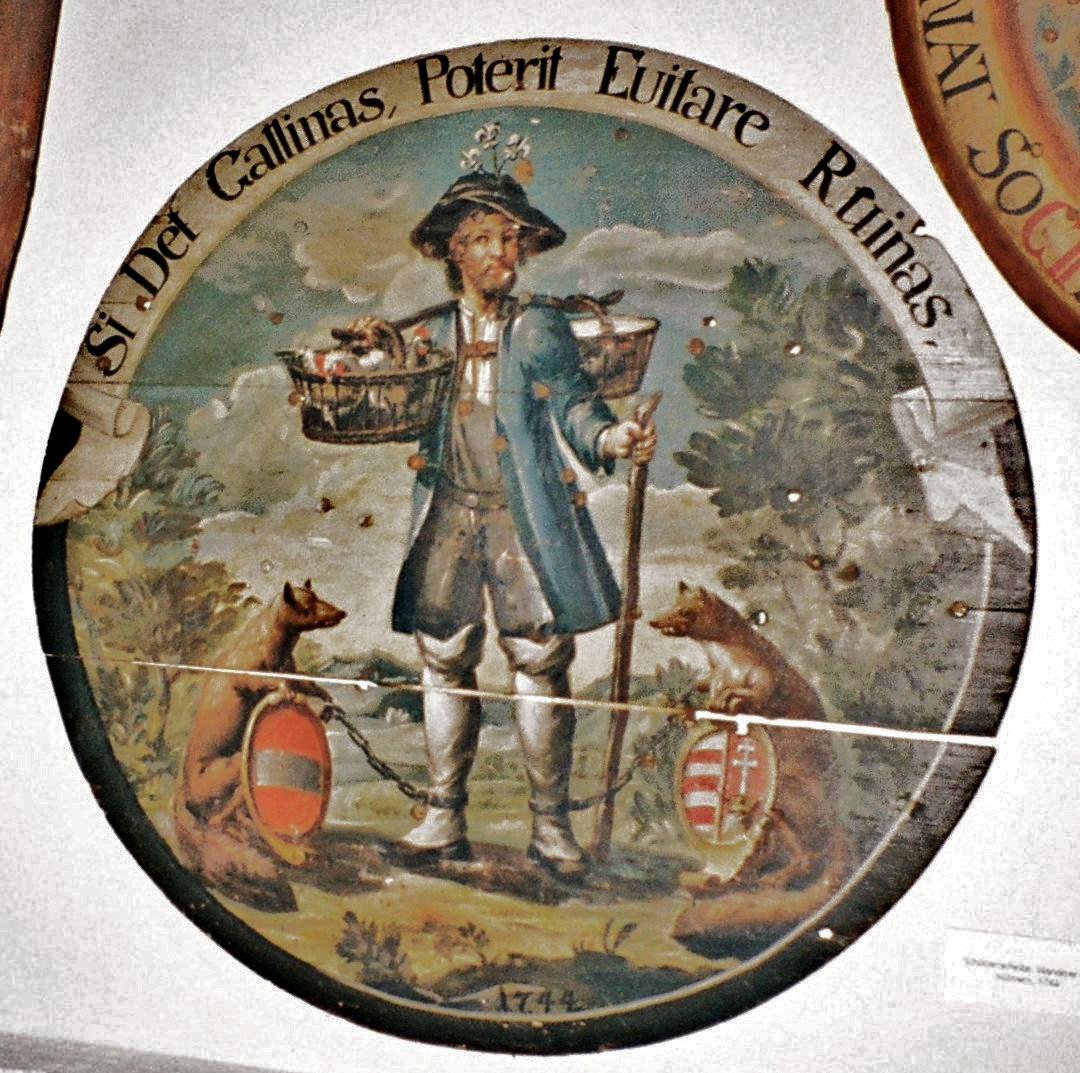
Ehrenscheibe from 1744 (Museum St. Veit an der Glan)

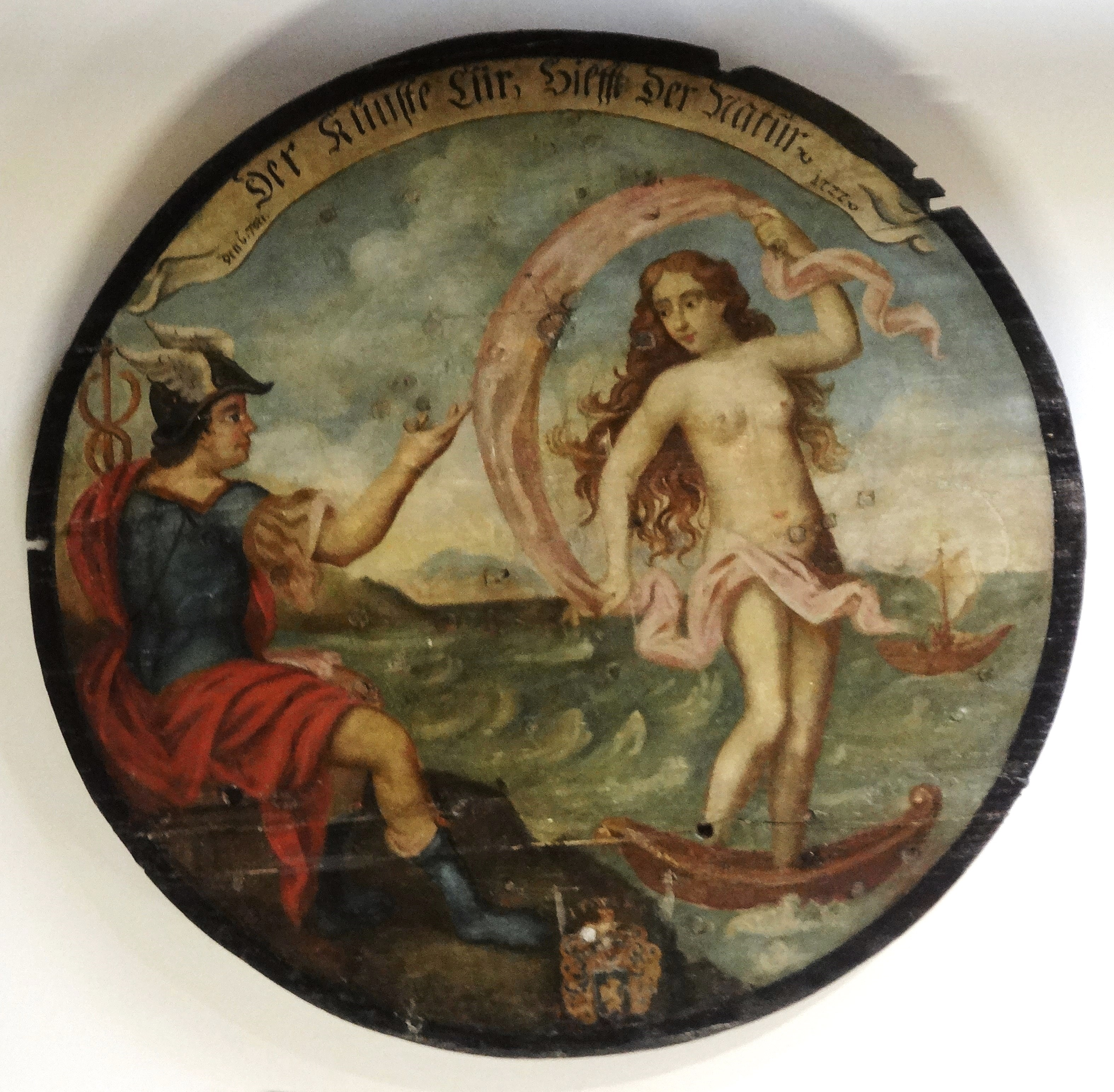
Target Disk from 1722 (Museum St. Veit an der Glan)

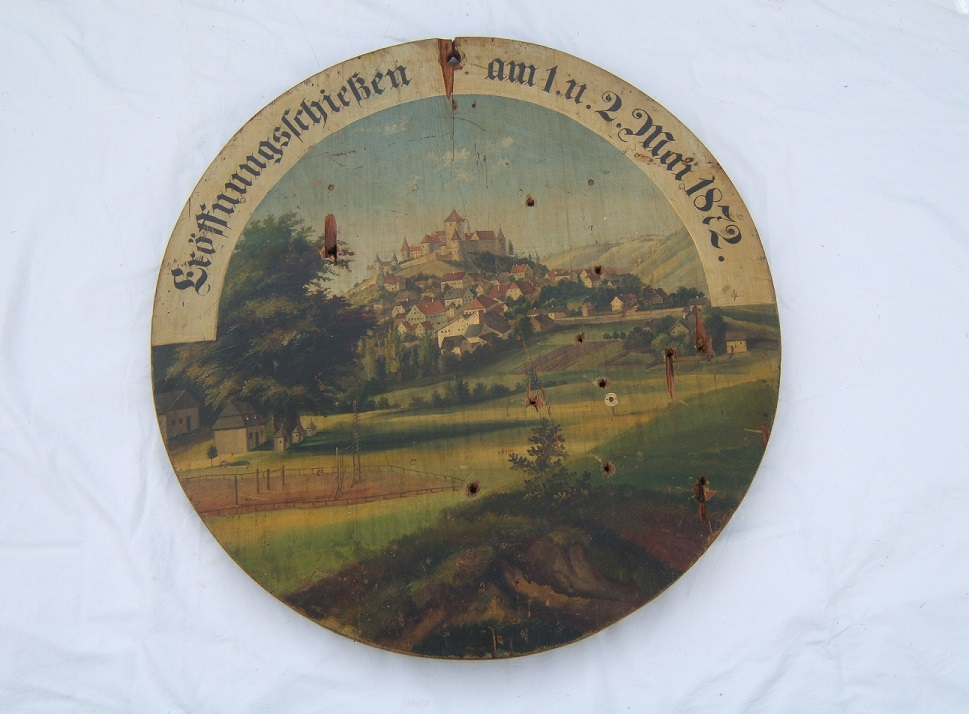
Target Disk from 1872 (1864er Schützen Wörth an der Donau)

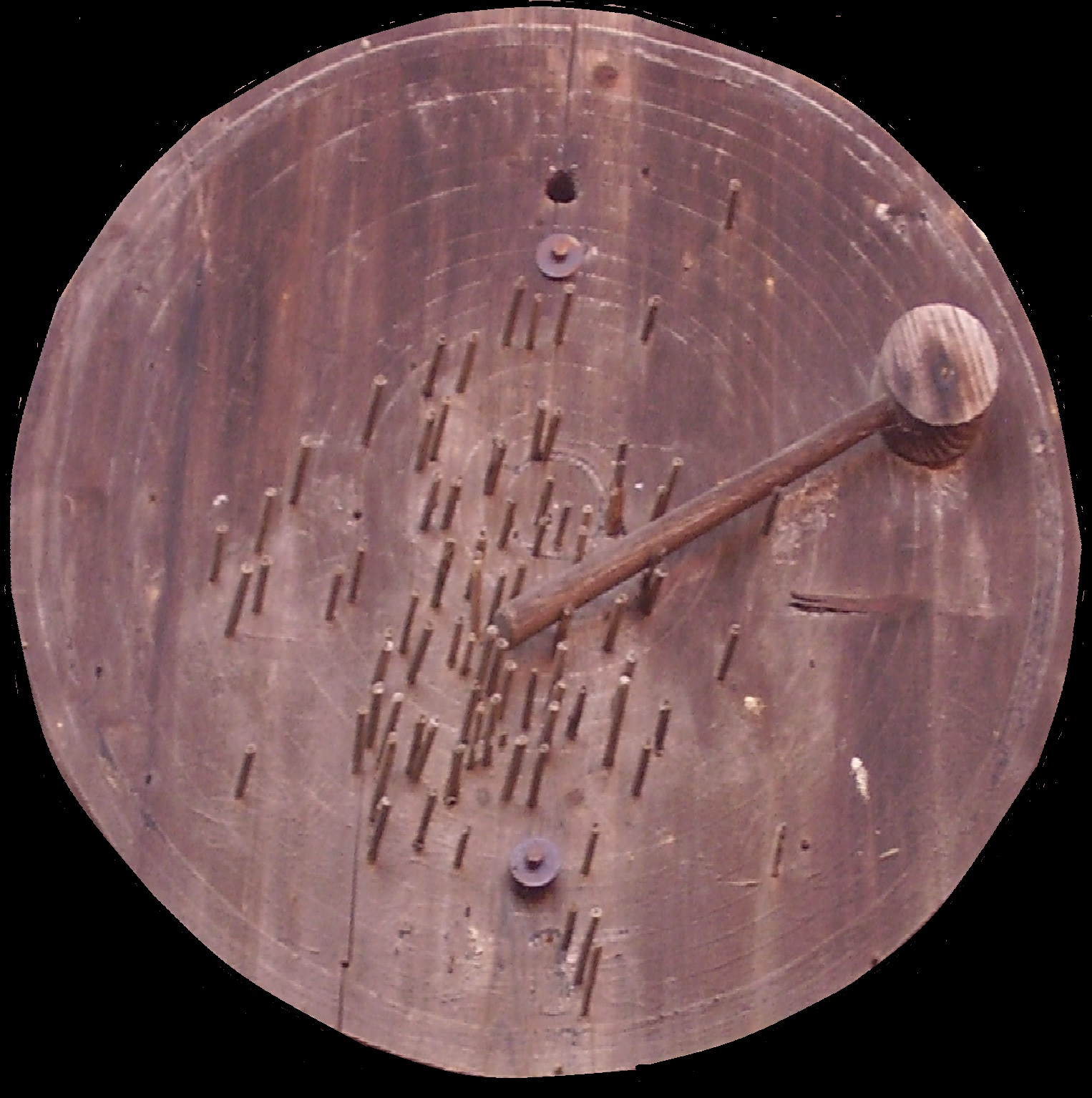
Historical Königsscheibe with Wooden Pegs

== Swiss Schützenfests ==
In Switzerland, the first national Swiss Federal Shooting Festival (Eidgenössisches Schützenfest) was held in 1824, but the local festivals also date back centuries earlier.

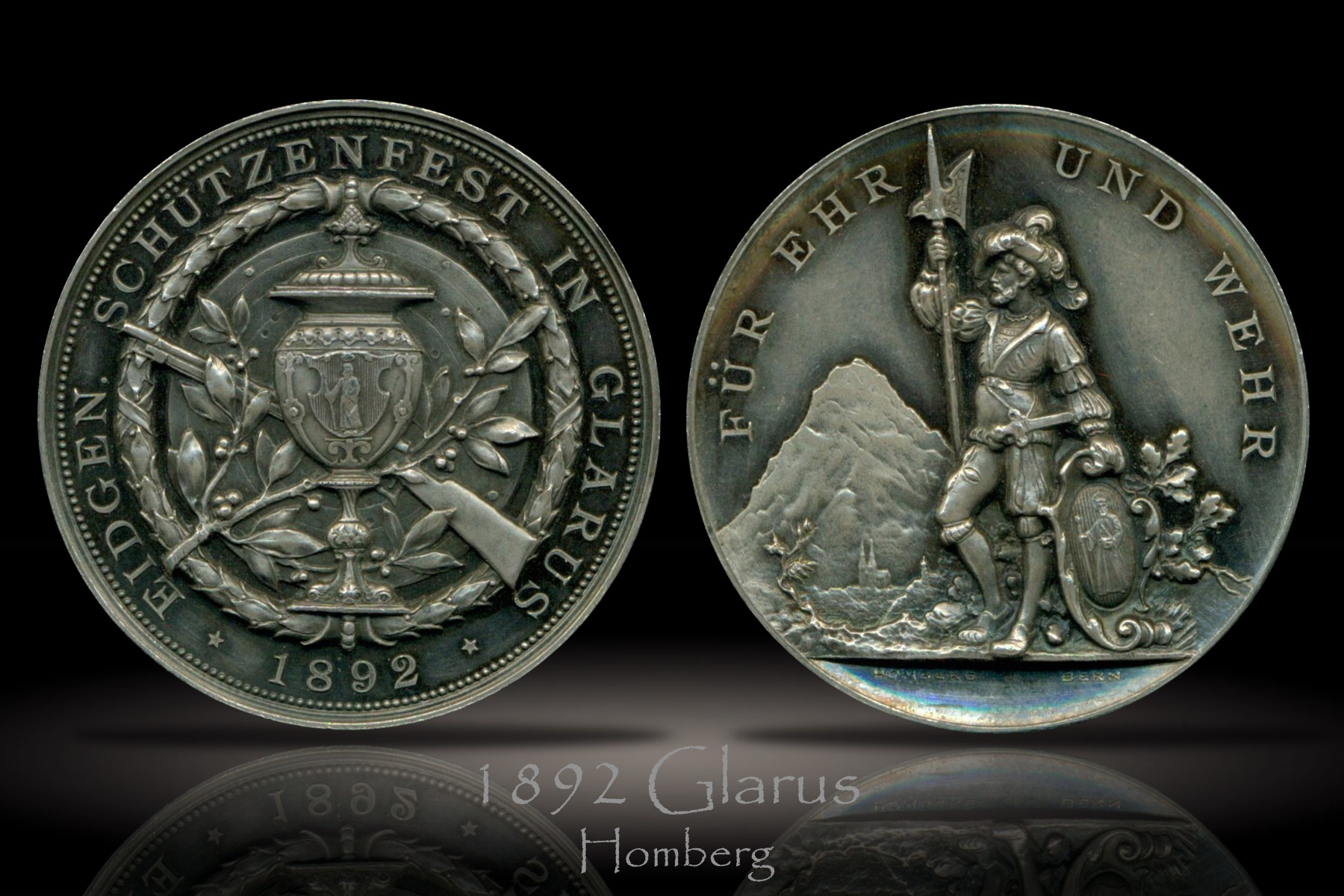
Glarus 1892 Schützenfest Medal

Shooting medals and shooting cups seem to be the common forms of Swiss awards. Swiss shooting medals were struck in a variety of metals including gold, silver, bronze, white metal, and aluminum, with silver being the most common. Mintages are very low, with the average mintage of the 45 millimetres (1.8 in) silver being 700-800 pieces. The scarcity of medals has increased over the years due to the awards being melted for bullion, being lost, and general attrition. The size of most medals range from 23 millimetres (0.91 in) to 62 millimetres (2.4 in) with 45 millimetres (1.8 in) being the most prevalent.

Shooting thalers are coins minted to commemorate shooting festivals. Swiss shooting thalers began mintage in 1842, with the Eidgenössisches Schützenfest in Chur, still under the cantonal authority of Graubünden. Shooting thalers between 1855 and 1934 were minted under federal authority, and were legal tender (with a nominal value of 5 francs). Shooting thalers continue to be minted today, but since 1939 are no longer legal tender.

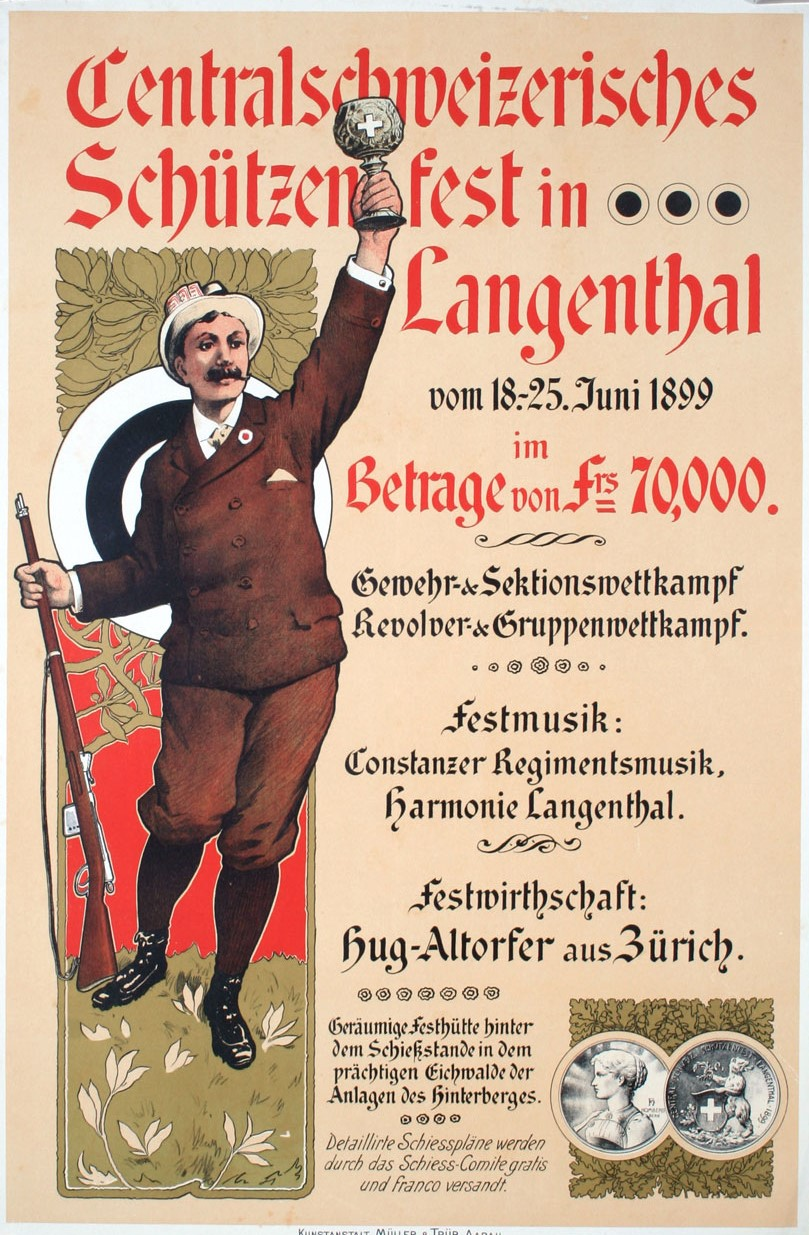
Poster advertising the 1899 Langenthal schützenfest

During the Middle Ages, many towns had to find ways to defend themselves from gangs of marauders. For this reason, clubs and associations were founded, comparable to militias; these paramilitary associations were sanctioned for the first time in the Law for the Defensive Constitution of the Towns by King Henry I, and officially integrated into the towns' defense plans. Accompanying the military exercises and physical examinations of the towns' contingents, festivities were combined with festive processions. Participants from other parishes and, at times, even the feudal heads of state were also invited to these Marksmen's Courts (Schützenhöfe). However, the self-confident spirit of the townsfolk that marked these festivities was not always regarded positively by the authorities. For this reason, different traditions developed in other regions. The military significance lessened over the centuries and became meaningless with the creation of regular troops and garrisons for national defense. The Schützenfests, however, continued in the form of a regional patriotic tradition.

== Switzerland ==
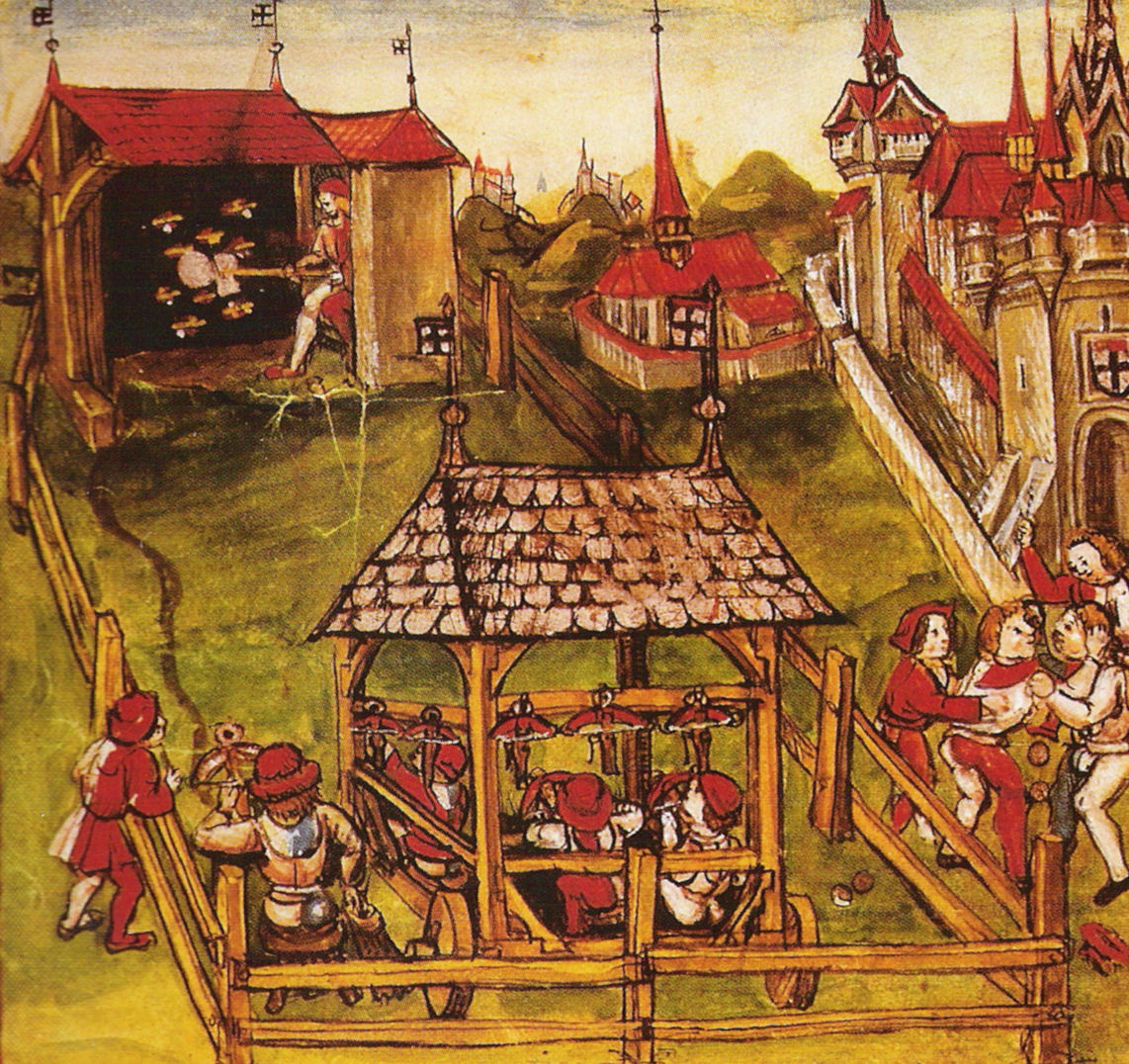
The Schützenfest in Konstanz of 1458 as depicted in the Luzerner Chronik of 1513.

Schützenfeste played a central role in the Old Swiss Confederacy, during the 15th century, participants shooting the crossbow, contributing significantly to the coherence between the individual cantons.

Eidgenössische Schützenfeste were organized by the Schweizerischer Schützenverein in the Restored Confederacy, for the first time in 1824. The first federal Schützenfest after the formation of the federal state, again held in Aarau, in 1849, figures prominently in Gottfried Kellers Das Fähnlein der Sieben Aufrechten, where Keller portrays the shooting clubs as vital for the preservation of direct democracy in the young Swiss federal state.

Further festivals were held between 1859 and 1939 at irregular intervals of 2 to 4 years, and between 1949 and 1977, at intervals of 3 to 6 years. From 1985, the Eidgenössisches Schützenfest was held regularly every five years. The 2020 event, postponed to 2021 due to the COVID-19 pandemic in Switzerland, is scheduled to be held from 11 June to 11 July 2021 in Luzern.

Countless cantonal and regional Schützenfeste take place in Switzerland every year.

== Germany ==
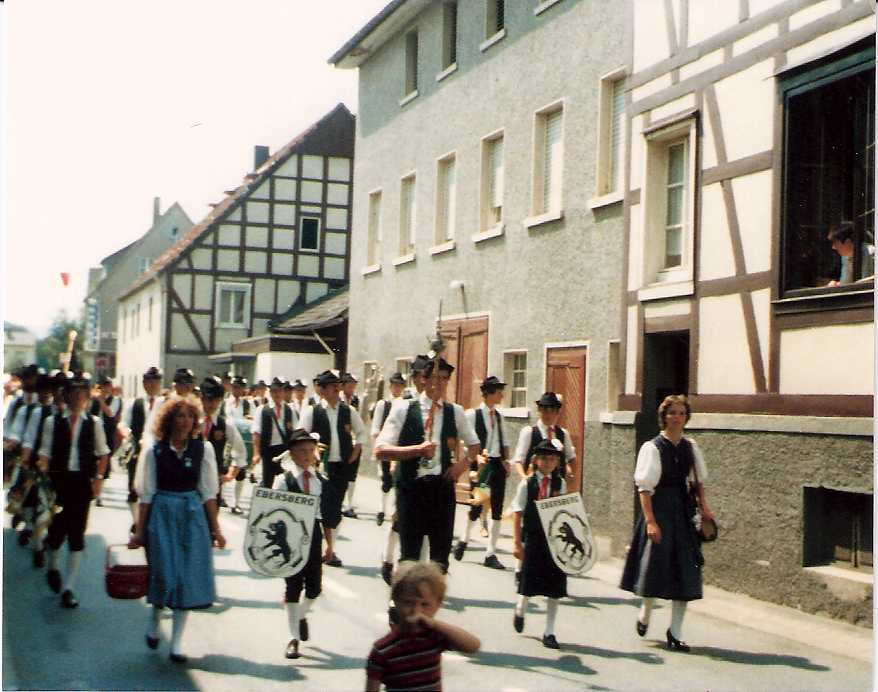
Balve 1982

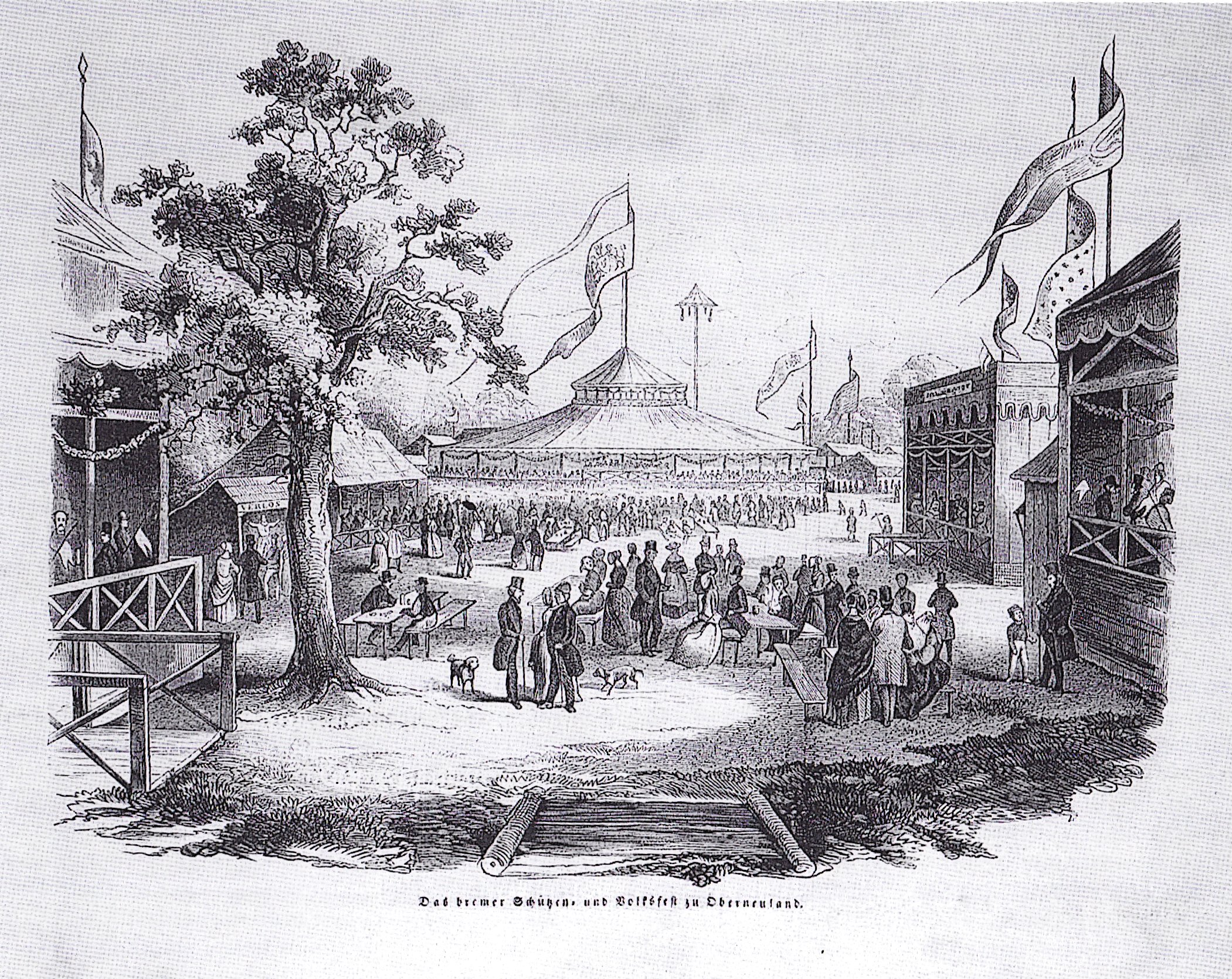
The Bremen Marksmen's and People's Festival (1846, wood-engraving from the Illustrirte Zeitung).

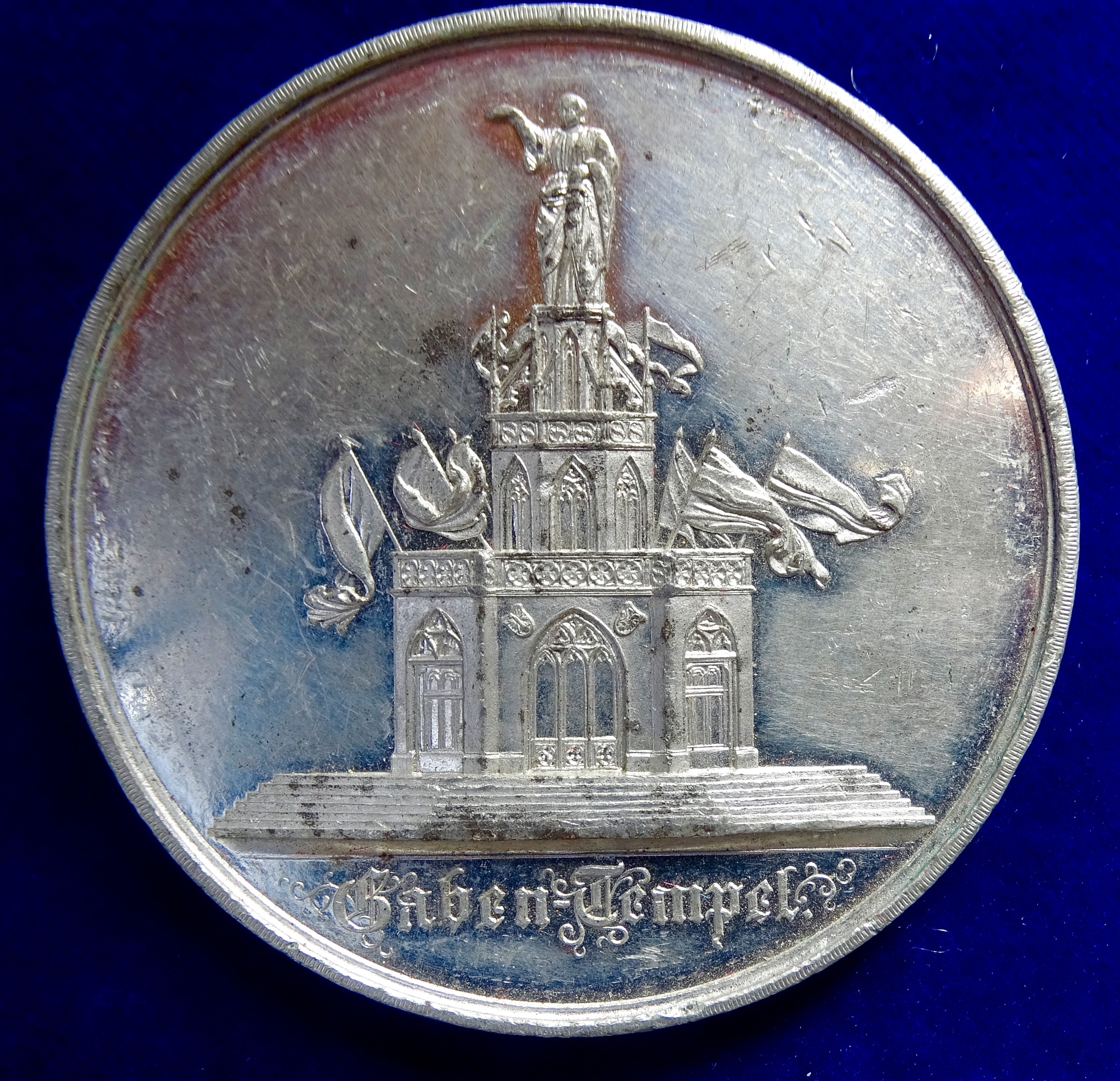
Medal of the 1. Deutsches Schützenfest in Frankfurt am Main 1862, obverse.

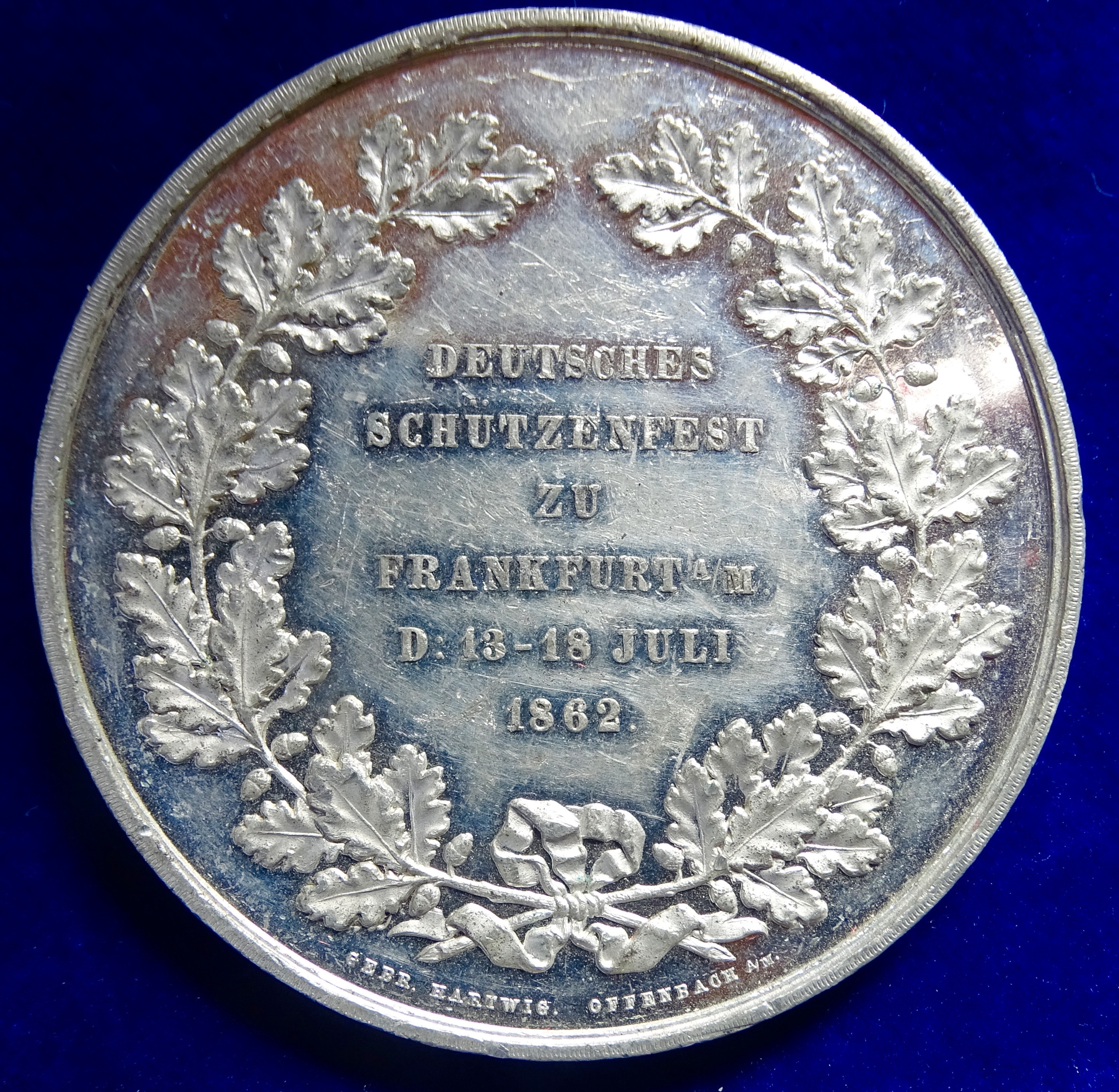
Medal of the 1. Deutsches Schützenfest in Frankfurt am Main 1862, reverse.

Schützenfests are celebrated mainly in Bavaria and Lower Saxony, but also in the Lower Rhine and Middle Rhine regions as well as in Westphalia (especially the Sauerland), with festive processions. Since German Reunification, Schützenfests have also begun to emerge in eastern parts of Germany. The traditions connected to the Schützenfest vary significantly from one region to another in Germany.

These traditions include the "Blow of the Flag" (a particular way of waving a flag). The Blow of the Flag in particular, and the waving of the flag in general, are executed according to fixed rules. Competitions are held in the discipline of flag-waving.

Schützenfests may range from one day to several days and may include and be accompanied by various events. They often occur in the festival room of a local public house or in a pavilion especially erected for the occasion. In the Sauerland, many towns have a special Marksmen's Hall that is used for these festivities. Many Schützenfests start with a festive procession, whereby the reigning King of Marksmen, the royal household, and local dignitaries are all escorted by the marksmen and paraded to the festive square or the festivities. This is often followed by a "royal parade" where the marksmen march past the king and the royal court, with marching bands, Corps of Drums, and fanfare bands playing along. The parading marksmen are formed in platoons or squads depending on the size of the formation, and in large towns and cities, marksmen are formed in companies and in both cases of the parade color guards march along with them. In a lot of cases, the pavilion is surrounded by a funfair.

The most common form of shooting competition is the Bird Shooting. The contestants no longer shoot at actual birds but on a mock bird made of wood and mounted on a pole. The contestant who demounts the last pieces of the wooden bird is the new King of Marksmen. Varying traditions may include shooting wooden animals other than birds or special awards won by hitting certain body parts, e.g., wings, beak, etc.

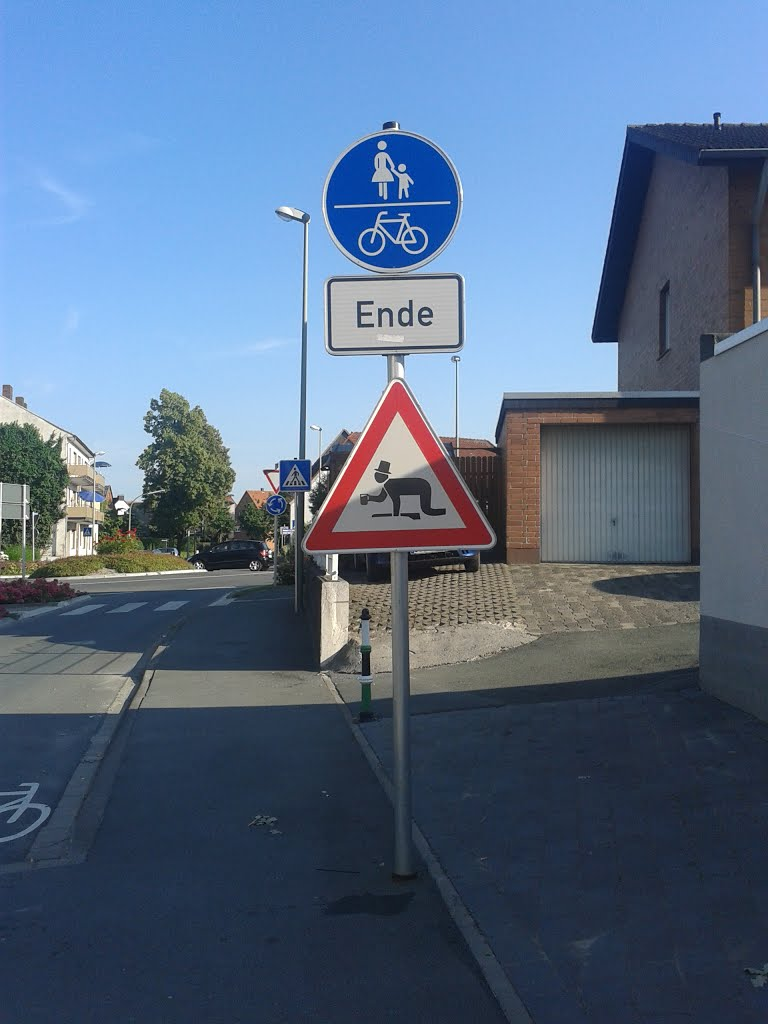
Special sign for 'Schützenfest' which doesn't belong to the regular German road signs in Geseke

Even a Großer Zapfenstreich and band concerts form part of the celebrations as well. The Großer Zapfenstreich done in these civil events, even though the military in origin as the festival itself, comprises the marksmen's organizations, torch-bearers, color guards, and a marching band and corps of drums, with an optional fanfare band when needed. Most are done outdoors, and there's an option to have an indoor ceremony done in the same manner as the outdoor ceremony. Many of the groups that help organize these festivities celebrate German pride, local community and state traditions, weapon drills (sans bayonets), and the wearing of local military uniforms. The use of the military hand salute is observed in many of these events. Typically the Bundeswehr marching practice is followed. Some have modern-styled marching bands, or bands modeled on foreign militaries, and march along during the parades with different variants per region. In Neuss, for example, the Rhine Guards Drum and Bugle Corps (based on the bands of the United States Marine Corps), and the Quirinus Band and Bugle Corps (under its current Bandmaster Peter Hosking - Ex Light Division), Germany's 1st ever band and bugles in the traditions of the British Army Light Division regiments (now The Rifles), that were based in West Germany during the Cold War years, have been a part of the parades there in recent years. A re-formed band, the Kapellen-Erft Band of the Grenadier Guards, perpetuates the traditions of the Foot Guards regiments of the British Household Division, which were deployed during the Cold War in Lower Saxony. A few corps only make use of the US-style hand-over-heart civil salute during the Großer Zapfenstreich to distinguish these associations from the Bundeswehr, which uses the military hand salute.

Notable German Schützenfests include

- Deutsches Bundesschießen: Organised by the German Shooting and Archery Federation, the first German Rifle Meeting was 1862 in Frankfurt am Main. So far, the last one was 2011 in Gotha.
- The Hanover Schützenfest: The largest Schützenfest in the world, including rifle platoons from all over Germany and the world
- The Neuss Schützenfest: The largest Schützenfest in the world that is organized by a single association and does not include platoons from other cities

== Overseas ==
Schützenfeste organized by German or Swiss expatriate communities overseas:

=== Australia ===
- Adelaide Schützenfest, as of 2021 run by the South Australian German Association in Brooklyn Park, South Australia

=== Brazil ===
- Jaraguá do Sul, Santa Catarina

=== Canada ===
- Rural Municipality of St. Andrews, Manitoba

=== Namibia ===
- The small southern town of Keetmanshoop had a Schützenhaus (marksmen's club house) as one of its first buildings, in 1905-07)

=== United States ===
- Altamont, Illinois
- Brea, California
- Artemas, Pennsylvania
- Auburn Hills, Michigan
- Bow Valley, Nebraska
- Cincinnati, Ohio
- Deshler, Ohio
- Ehrhardt, South Carolina
- Fredericksburg, Texas
- Grapetown, Texas
- Las Vegas, Nevada
- New Glarus, Wisconsin
- Phoenix, Arizona
- Raton, New Mexico (Annual International Schützenfest)
- San Diego, California
- Westside, Iowa
