= French ship Artémise =

Three ships of the French Navy have borne the name Artémise in honour of Queen Artemisia I of Caria:

- Artémise (1794), a 32-gun Magicienne-class frigate
- Artémise (1829), a 60-gun frigate which took part in the Laplace affair in Honolulu.
- Artémise (1847), a 28-gun corvette

== See also ==
- French ship Artémis
- HMS Artemis
- USS Artemis
