= Neuss Schützenfest =

The Neuss Schützenfest, officially the Neuss' Citizens' Marksmen's Festival (German: Neusser Bürger-Schützenfest), is the Schützenfest of the German city of Neuss. It is held annually on the last weekend in August. With more than 7,500 parading marksmen it is smaller than the Hanover Schützenfest but is regarded as the largest marksmen's festival in the world that is organized by a single association and does not include platoons from other cities. The year 2011 saw the largest number of trooping marksmen to date, with 6,951 marksmen taking part in the parade. The marksmen's festival with its royal parade, several processions, royal shooting competition and a great number of accompanying events is a social highlight of the city of Neuss and the surrounding area and attracts up to a million visitors each year. The largest number of visitors to date was recorded in 2007, with 1.5 million people coming to watch the Schützenfest.

== The Regiment ==
While the Schützenfests of the Middle Ages were primarily military in character, cultivation of traditions and social aspects are the main focus of the modern day festivities. For this reason, the marksmen wear uniforms with mock guns, often decorated with flowers sticking out of the barrel.

In 2017 the regiment consisted of around 7,860 actives; i.e., parading, marksmen and musicians with an undetermined number of reserves. It is divided into different corps, each wearing their own distinct dress uniform. The Schützenfest is organized by the Neuss Citizens' Marksmen's Association, of which all marksmen are members. This association is headed by a committee of 10–12 members, among them the Colonel (Oberst), the highest-ranking officer and the commandant of the regiment. Ceremonially the Schützenfest is represented by the King of Marksmen (Schützenkönig), who is determined each year in a traditional shooting competition. Application for the regality is open to all marksmen, however, it involves a lot of expenditure of time and money from both the king and his wife and for his children, optionally. The king is not a member of the association's committee, however.

The marching bands, corps of drums and fanfare bands present come from the Neuss area and beyond, following the old German band pattern, however the Quirinus Band and Bugle Corps, a new band raised in 2011 and based in the vicinity, marches in the British Light infantry band tradition in a record 160 paces per minute (as it is affiliated to the Royal Green Jackets association in the UK and is the first ever German marching band of its kind, their present Bandmaster being Peter Hosking, who is an ex Royal Green Jacket and Light Infantry Musician).

== The Corps ==
The regiment, brigade sized with more than 7,860 serving actively as of 2017, is divided into a total of 10 corps that have been established over time. Only two of these corps, the Grenadeer Corps and the Riflemen Corps were in existence in the times of the first modern day Schützenfest in 1823. Except the Sappers, most are company sized or battalion-sized formations, only 2 are regiment-sized.

Each corps has its own distinctive uniforms. Apart from the Squires, the Scheibenschützen, the Artillery Battery and the Cavalry, all corps are further divided into platoons (Züge) of 15–30 marksmen each. A corps is generally headed by a Major or Captain (Hauptmann), while platoons are headed by First Lieutenants (Oberleutnant).

=== The Sapper Corps (Das Neusser Sappeur Korps von 1830) ===
The Sappers form the smallest of the existing corps, consisting of a single platoon with a current total of 22 members. They wear a blue uniform jacket under a white apron, a high mock bearskin cap topped by a red and white brush, as well as an axe and a hunting dagger. Since 1830 they march at the head of the regiment and act as honour guard for the Marksmen's King.

=== The Grenadier Corps (Das Neusser Grenadierkorps von 1823) ===
The Grenadeers took part in the modern day Schützenfest since its inception in 1823. They wear white trousers, a white shirt, a white bow tie, a black cutaway coat or evening tailcoat with a black vest or cummerbund, as well as a black top hat. They traditionally carry mock rifles. The officers wear a blue uniform jacket and a bicorne instead of the tailcoat and top hat and a saber instead of the rifle. In 2011 the Grenadeers were the second largest of the corps.

=== The Squire Corps (Das Edelknaben-Korps von 1835) ===
The Squire Corps offers a chance for young boys past the age of 7, to take part in the Schützenfest. Few other corps of the regiment allow for active participation of children in the parades. The uniform of the squires consists of a black jacket, a red and white sash worn diagonally across it and short trousers made of black velvet, they wear a saber on parade. The Squire's cap is adorned with a red and white pom-pon. Presumably the origins of the squires reach back to former times, when young girls in white dresses would accompany the royal carriage and throw flower petals.

The year 1835 is usually regarded as founding year of the Squire Corps. However this date has not been verified and is based solely based on the earliest available receipts for the acquisition of the uniforms. At the royal parade the squires form an honor guard for the king, the committee and VIPs in the saluting base. During the processions and the inspection for the royal parade, they march ahead of the king's carriage and the mounted escort behind.

=== The Riflemen Corps (Das Neusser Jägerkorps von 1823) ===
Just like the Grenadeer Corps, the Riflemen Corps was founded as early as 1823. For a long time it was the largest corps of the regiment. Nowadays it is the 3rd largest unit with some 850 marksmen. The Riflemen wear a green uniform jacket, white trousers, and a green hat. To the left of each platoon, one marksmen (called a Hönes) carries a giant drinking horn adorned with flowers.

=== The Schützenlust Corps (Die Neusser Schützenlust 1864/1950) ===
The Schützenlust was established in 1864. In 1930 it was disbanded for lack of new members, but in 1950 it was successfully revived. The Schützenlust wear a double-breasted green uniform jacket along with white trousers and a green hat.

In 2017 the Schützenlust formed the largest contingent of the regiment.

=== St. Hubertus-Marksmen-Society (St. Hubertus-Schützen-Gesellschaft Neuss 1899) ===
The St. Hubertus-Marksmen-Society was founded in 1899. The Hubertus-marksmen wear a green uniform jacket, black trousers and a black head with a green ribbon. Similarly to the Riflemen, they too carry a horn adorned with flowers. The Hubertus-marksmen range among the smaller corps, with approximately 630 members. After World War II the Hubertus marksmen also struggled with a decline in membership. Due to the initiative of the committee the society was successfully revived in 1953.

=== The Marksmen's Guild (Die Schützengilde Neuss von 1850/1961 e. V.) ===
The Marksmen's Guild existed initially from 1850 to 1891. It was revived 70 years later in 1961. The marksmen of the Guild wear a green uniform jacket, black trousers and a green hat adorned with a white feather. They too are among the smaller corps with 30 platoons and approximately 500 members in total.

=== Platoon of the Scheibenschützen-Society (Der Zug der Neusser Scheibenschützen-Gesellschaft von 1415) ===
The history of the Scheibenschützen goes back to the St. Sebastianus Brotherhood, which organized shooting competitions as early as 1415. However the Scheibenschützen have only been taken part in Schützenfest with their own platoon since 1920. 120 marksmen march in a three row formation. They wear a grey uniform jacket and black trousers as well as a hat. To demonstrate their deference to the king all of the Scheibenschützen take off their hats in unison as they march past him and the court.

=== The Artillery Corps(Das Neusser Artillerie-Corps 1854) ===
The Artillery Corps was founded in 1851, but has only been allowed to take part in the Schützenfest since 1854. The corps comprises artillerists both mounted and on foot. There is a limber carrying a large cannon drawn by six draught horses.

=== The Cavalry Corps (Das Neusser Reitercorps 1828) ===
The Cavalry Corps was founded in 1828. The cavaliers wear a black equestrian tailcoat with a red and white sash underneath. The cavalry platoon marks the end of the processions and is preceded by the Quirinus Band and Bugle Corps, the last band on parade and also the fastest due to the 140-paces a minute march as mentioned earlier.

== Festivities ==
The Schützenfest's cornerstones are the royal parade, the processions and the royal shooting competition. Apart from that, there are several events of varying size and formality. The Schützenfest takes place on the weekend of the last Sunday in August. It starts on Saturday and ends on Tuesday. The travelling funfair, which is a part of the festival, is already opened on the Friday afternoon at 17:00, with the traditional tapping of the first keg.

The official opening of the Schützenfest at 12:00 on Saturday is marked by a gun salute, the hoisting of the flags outside the city's buildings and the tolling of the bells of the Saint-Quirinus Church. At 17:00 an act of remembrance takes place on the market square, in front of the city hall. Immediately afterwards the marching bands, Corps of Drums and fanfare bands strike up and march through the city.

In the evening, the torchlight procession marks the first procession of the festivities. For this, the marksmen carry torches instead of their usual mock rifles and a dark suit instead of their uniforms. Several platoons build grand torches (Großfackeln), which are drawn through the city on carts. These grand torches generally show satirical depictions of social and political events of the previous year and are designed to raise social and political issues in a comical context. They are the main attraction of the torch procession. Each year, between 85 and 95 grand torches are built.

On Sunday morning, the royal parade takes place. On this event, the whole of the regiment and the bands march past the king and the committee on the market square. Frequently high ranking VIPs are present for this, and the whole parade is broadcast on television. In 2010 for instance, the then-minister of the interior Thomas de Maizière was among them. (The Sunday morning activities are broadcast live on Westdeutscher Rundfunk.) This is followed by several parades through the city, on Sunday afternoon, on Monday afternoon and on Monday evening, as well as on Tuesday afternoon and Tuesday evening.

Following the Tuesday afternoon parade, the new marksmen's king is decided upon out on the festival grounds. Those marksmen applying for the regality take turns shooting at a log of wood (symbolizing a bird), mounted on a pole. Although the log is a relatively easy target to hit, 20 to 40 straight shots are needed to demount it. Thus the regality is determined by the contestant's luck to a far greater extent than by their shooting skills.

When a new king has been found the "Great Tattoo" takes place in the pavilion on the festival grounds following the event. It is played in annually rotating order by the 1. Neusser Regimentstambourkorps, the Neusser Tambourkorps „In Treue fest“ and the „Bundes Tambourkorps Novesia 1912 Neuss“ along with the Musikverein Holzheim. The marching bands enter the pavilion accompanied by the Sapper Corps, playing the Yorckscher Marsch by Ludwig van Beethoven. The future king receives the first salutes of the ceremony at this point.

In the evening, a last informal procession (the so-called "Wackelzug"/"Wobbling Procession") is led through the city, with people dancing in the streets. Some marksmen "decorate" their uniforms or think of funny interludes for their platoon. At the end of this procession, the marksmen march past in front of their new king for the first time.

At around 24:00 the "Great Tattoo" of the Platoon of the Scheibenschützen-Society takes place on the square in front of the minster. Although it is no official event of the Neuss' Citizens' Marksmen's Association it is traditionally attended by the committee, the new king and a number of platoons of the Schützenlust, the largest contingent of the regiment. The Tambourcorps „Deutschmeister Köln“ 1951 Roggendorf/Thenhoven and the Vereinigte Jägerkapelle Straberg 1926 both enter the square playing the Yorckscher Marsch (1813) by Ludwig van Beethoven. As serenades ring out a together played army march, like the Mussinan march of Carl Carl, the Alexandermarsch of Andreas Leonhardt or the König Ludwig II.-Marsch of Georg Seifert as well as Des großen Kurfürsten Reitermarsch of Cuno Graf of Moltke which is played by the Vereinigte Jägerkapelle Straberg 1926 only. With the splendor of the military-style tattoo, timpani rolls, the national anthem, the lowering of the colors and the concluding tolling of bells of the Quirinus Church at the striking of the hourly bell, it is regarded by many as dignified conclusion to the festivities.

=== Other events ===
During the Schützenfest, the balls of the individual corps take place, for instance the Ball of the Grenadeers and the Ball of the Schützenlust on Sunday and the Ball of the Riflemen on Monday. Apart from that there is usually a wide variety of parties going on throughout the city.

=== Events outside of the actual Schützenfest ===
Six weeks ahead of the Schützenfest the "Assembly of Citizens and Sons of Citizens" (Versammlung der Bürger und Bürgerssöhne) takes place. On this occasion, a speaker puts the question to vote, whether the Schützenfest should be held again in the respective year. The assembled citizens and marksmen traditionally answer this with a unified cry of "Zoch, Zoch!" (regional Dialect meaning "Procession, Procession!")

On the Saturday three weeks ahead of the Schützenfest, the Colonel (Oberst) is elected (Colonel's Dinner/Oberstehrenabend). Following this, a procession takes place in the honour of the new colonel. The marksmen wear suits and carry torches. The outgoing Colonel officially retires, and receives the final salutes of the regiment during the procession.

On the Saturday two weeks ahead of the Schützenfest, the Royal Dinner (Königsehrenabend) is held. On this occasion, the king has the opportunity to award decorations to individual marksmen of his choice. Following this, a procession similar to that at the Colonel's Dinner takes place. The outgoing king receives the final salutes from the regiment in this parade.

On the Saturday following the Schützenfest, the Coronation Ball is held, where the new king is officially enthroned and the old king ends his duties.

== History ==
=== Creation ===
During the Middle Ages, a lot of German cities organized annual drills and shooting contests so that the citizens would be able to defend the freedom of their city in times of war. The oldest historically verified organization, which organized such drills in Neuss, was the Sebastianus-Fraternity as early as 1415.

The Schützenfest in its present form was first celebrated in the year 1823. Following the end of French occupation under Napoléon Bonaparte the Neuss Bachelor's Sodality asked permission to organize a shooting competition as well as a festive procession as an addition to the already existing fun fair.

Some 100 men participated in this first event. In 1824 this number had already increased to 135 participants. In the course of the following decades the rituals and organizational structures that are still in use today gradually took shape: in 1833 a committee was elected, which was entrusted with organizing the Schützenfest, in 1840 the royal parade was added to the events. Gradually the individual corps emerged as subdivisions of the regiment. In 1901, following the adoption of the Civil Code of Germany the Neuss Citizens' Marksmen's Association (Neusser Bürger-Schützen-Verein) is officially registered as a voluntary association.

=== World Wars ===
On 25 July 1914 it was decided to go on with the preparations for the years Schützenfest, despite the looming possibility of war. However, as mobilization began as early the 1 August the festivities had to be suspended in this and the following years.

In 1920 the occupational administration authorized a restoration of the festivities. The international press however regarded the celebrations as a "longing for revenge, a resurgence of militarism". Therefore, the Schützenfest was banned in 1923 and 1924 only authorized again by the Belgian administration in 1925, one week ahead of the traditional date. In 1927 the 100th jubilee festivities, which would have actually been in the year 1923, were belatedly celebrated by 1200 marksmen.

During the Great Depression the Schützenfest was suspended in 1931, but was held again in the years afterwards. However the organizers came increasingly into conflict with the ruling National Socialists. In 1937, for instance, the Nazi official in charge of the district demanded that the city's clergy must not be permitted to attend the parade from within the city hall, however without avail. Platoon names that featured religious symbolism were forbidden. In 1939 the last Schützenfest was celebrated before the outbreak of World War II. Only a few days later, the first military transport trains left the city of Düsseldorf. The royal shooting competition had not been held in 1939, so that the reigning "monarch" Robert Lonnes was only officially relieved, when the Schützenfest was revived in 1948. He is therefore the king with the longest tenure in the history of the festival.

=== Post war years – present ===
In 1947 the Schützen marched in silence from the city hall to the Quirinus-Minster, through the ruins of the city. It was not until 1948 that a new royal shooting competition was held. A complete Schützenfest with four days of festivities, as it was held before, has only been organized again since 1949.

Due to the COVID-19 pandemic, the 2020 festivities were cancelled, together with the associated events linked to the festival, for two straight years. The festivities only returned in 2022.

== List of Marksmen's Kings ==
| Name | Year | Corps |
|---|---|---|
| H. M. Bernhard I. | 1950 | Riflemen |
| H. M. Carl Arthur I. | 1951 | Riflemen |
| H. M. Arthur I. | 1952 | Grenadeers |
| H.M. Ernst I. | 1953 | N/A |
| H. M. Hermann Wilhelm I. | 1954 | N/A |
| H.M. Josef VII. | 1955 | N/A |
| H. M. Josef VIII. | 1956 | Schützenlust |
| H. M. Bruno I. | 1957 | Hubertus marksmen |
| H. M. Peter Wilhelm I. | 1958 | Schützenlust |
| H. M. Joseph IX. | 1959 | Scheibenschützen |
| H. M. Karl VIII. | 1960 | Hubertus marksmen |
| H. M. Bernd II. | 1961 | Scheibenschützen |
| H. M. Heinrich XII. | 1962 | Riflemen |
| H. M. Christian IV. | 1963 | N/A |
| H. M. Hermann VI. | 1964 | N/A |
| H. M. Gert I. | 1965 | Schützenlust |
| H. M. Hanns I. | 1966 | Grenadeers |
| H. M. Hans II. | 1967 | Grenadeers |
| H. M. Norbert I. | 1968 | Schützenlust |
| H. M. Helmut I. | 1969 | Scheibenschützen |
| H. M. Mathias I. | 1970 | Hubertus marksmen |
| H. M. Heinz Günther I. | 1971 | Schützenlust |
| H. M. Alfred I. | 1972 | Marksmen's Guild |
| H. M. Karl IX. | 1973 | Schützenlust |
| H. M. Gerd IV. | 1974 | N/A |
| H. M. Alexander I. | 1975 | Hubertus marksmen |
| H. M. Willy XI. | 1976 | N/A |
| H. M. Hermann Josef I. | 1977 | Grenadeers |
| H. M. Heinz Peter I. | 1978 | Riflemen |
| H. M. Helmut II. | 1979 | Scheibenschützen |

| Name | Year | Corps |
|---|---|---|
| H. M. Herbert I. | 1980 | Schützenlust |
| H. M. Hans III. | 1981 | Marksmen's Guild |
| H. M. Rainer I. | 1982 | Hubertus marksmen |
| H. M. Siegfried I. | 1983 | Schützenlust |
| H. M. Holger I. | 1984 | Riflemen |
| H. M. Toni I. | 1985 | Schützenlust |
| H. M. Josef X. | 1986 | Riflemen |
| H. M. Werner II. | 1987 | Riflemen |
| H. M. Werner III. | 1988 | Schützenlust |
| H. M. Horst I. | 1989 | Scheibenschützen |
| H. M. Thomas I. | 1990 | Grenadeers |
| H. M. Jakob III. | 1991 | Grenadeers |
| H. M. Hans-Dieter I. | 1992 | Scheibenschützen |
| H. M. Christian V. | 1993 | Grenadeers |
| H. M. Bernhard III. | 1994 | Riflemen |
| H. M. Hans IV. | 1995 | Hubertus marksmen |
| H. M. Erich I. | 1996 | Grenadeers |
| H. M. Heinz-Willi I. | 1997 | Grenadeers |
| H. M. Adi I. | 1998 | Marksmen's Guild |
| H. M. Dieter I. | 1999 | Scheibenschützen |
| H. M. Hans-Josef I. | 2000 | Schützenlust |
| H. M. Franz-Josef I. | 2001 | Schützenlust |
| H. M. Josef XI. | 2002 | Riflemen |
| H. M. Marco I. | 2003 | Grenadeers |
| H. M. Günter I. | 2004 | Sappers |
| H. M. Karl-Theo I. | 2005 | Schützenlust |
| H. M. Mario I. | 2006 | Schützenlust |
| H. M. Horst II. | 2007 | Grenadeers |
| H. M. Hermann I. | 2008 | Grenadeers |
| H. M. Joachim I. | 2009 | Schützenlust |
| H. M. Werner IV. | 2010 | Scheibenschützen |
| S. M. Rainer II. | 2011 | Grenadeers |
| S. M. Jörg I. | 2012 | Schützenlust |

== Other facts ==
On three sides of the city hall's tower, traffic lights are permanently mounted especially for the orientation of the marksmen during the processions. At the beginning of the processions, the lights are turned from red to green so that marksmen on trooping grounds further off into the city know when to start marching.

Even though the Neuss Regiment comprises more than 7,500 marksmen, it is led by a "Colonel" and not a "General" as its commandant.
