= SS Artemis =

A number of steamships have carried the name Artemis, including -

- SS Artemis (1901), a Greek cargo ship that sank in 1932
- SS Artemis (1902)
- SS Artemis (1912)

== See also ==
- MV Artemis for motor vessels named Artemis
