= Artemus =

Artemus may refer to:

- Artemus, Kentucky
- Nick Allen (catcher) or Artemus Ward "Nick" Allen (1888–1939), American baseball player
- Artemus de Almeida (born 1969), Brazilian equestrian
- Artemus Gates (1895–1976), American politician
- Artemus Gordon, a character on the TV series The Wild Wild West
- Artemus Ogletree (died 1935), American victim of an unsolved murder
- Artemus Ward (1834–1867), American humorist
- Artemus E. Weatherbee (1918–1995), U.S. Department of the Treasury official

== Redirect ==
- Artemas (disambiguation)
- Artemis (disambiguation)
