= HMS Auriga =

Submarine of the Royal Navy

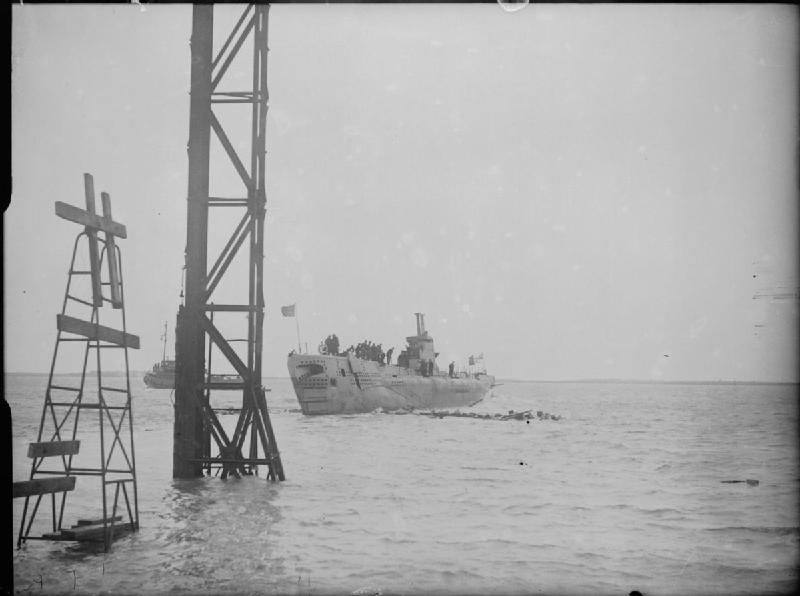
- Auriga after launching

History

United Kingdom
- Name: Auriga
- Builder: Vickers-Armstrongs, Barrow-in-Furness
- Laid down: 7 June 1944
- Launched: 29 March 1945
- Commissioned: 12 January 1946
- Identification: Pennant number P419 (Later S69)
- Fate: Sold to be broken up for scrap on 14 November 1974. Scrapped at Newport in February 1975.

General characteristics
- Class & type: Amphion-class submarine
- Displacement: 1,360/1,590 tons (surface/submerged)
- Length: 293 ft 6 in (89.46 m)
- Beam: 22 ft 4 in (6.81 m)
- Draught: 18 ft 1 in (5.51 m)
- Propulsion: 2 × 2,150 hp (1,600 kW) Admiralty ML 8-cylinder diesel engine, 2 × 625 hp (466 kW) electric motors for submergence driving two shafts
- Speed: 18.5 knots (34.3 km/h; 21.3 mph) surfaced; 8 knots (15 km/h; 9.2 mph) submerged
- Range: 10,500 nautical miles (19,400 km) at 11 knots (20 km/h) surfaced; 16 nautical miles (30 km) at 8 knots (15 km/h) submerged
- Test depth: 350 ft (110 m)
- Complement: 60
- Armament: 6 × 21 inch (533 mm) (2 external) bow torpedo tube, 4 × 21 in (533 mm) (2 external) stern torpedo tube, containing a total of 20 torpedoes; Mines: 26; 1 × 4 in (102 mm) main deck gun, 3 × 0.303 in (7.70 mm) machine gun, 1 × Oerlikon 20 mm gun

HMS Auriga (P419/S69), was an Amphion-class submarine of the Royal Navy, built by Vickers-Armstrongs and launched 29 March 1945.

== Design ==
Auriga had a displacement of 1,360 long tons (1,380 t) when at the surface and 1,590 long tons (1,620 t) while submerged. She had a total length of 293 feet 6 inches (89.46 m), a beam of 22 feet 4 inches (6.81 m), and a draught of 18 feet 1 inch (5.51 m). The submarine was powered by two Admiralty ML eight-cylinder diesel engines generating a power of 2,150 horsepower (1,600 kW) each. She also contained four electric motors each producing 625 horsepower (466 kW) that drove two shafts. She could carry a maximum of 219 tonnes (241 short tons) of diesel, although she usually carried between 159 and 165 tonnes (175 and 182 short tons).

The submarine had a maximum surface speed of 18.5 knots (34.3 km/h; 21.3 mph) and a submerged speed of 8 knots (15 km/h; 9.2 mph). When submerged, she could operate at 3 knots (5.6 km/h; 3.5 mph) for 90 nautical miles (170 km; 100 mi) or at 8 knots (15 km/h; 9.2 mph) for 16 nautical miles (30 km; 18 mi). When surfaced, she was able to travel 15,200 nautical miles (28,200 km; 17,500 mi) at 10 knots (19 km/h; 12 mph) or 10,500 nautical miles (19,400 km; 12,100 mi) at 11 knots (20 km/h; 13 mph). She was fitted with ten 21 inches (530 mm) torpedo tubes, one QF 4 inch naval gun Mk XXIII, one Oerlikon 20 mm cannon, and a .303 British Vickers machine gun. Her torpedo tubes were fitted to the bow and stern, and she could carry twenty torpedoes. Her complement was sixty-one crew members.

== Service history ==
In 1953 she took part in the Fleet Review to celebrate the Coronation of Elizabeth II. In March 1961, the submarine was among the vessels that took part in a combined naval exercise with the United States Navy off Nova Scotia. Auriga departed Canada on 25 April 1961 after completing an 18-month tour with the Sixth Submarine Division at Halifax, Nova Scotia.

== Publications ==
- Colledge, J. J.; Warlow, Ben (2006) [1969]. Ships of the Royal Navy: The Complete Record of All Fighting Ships of the Royal Navy from the 15th Century to the Present (3rd Rev ed.). London: Chatham Publishing. ISBN 978-1-86176-281-8. OCLC 67375475.
