= French ship Artémis =

Two submarines of the French Navy have borne the name Artémis in honour of the goddess Artemis:

- French submarine Artémis (1914), an Amphitrite-class submarine launched in 1914 and struck in 1927.
- French submarine Artémis (Q206), an Aurore-class submarine launched in 1942 and struck in 1967.

== See also ==
- French ship Artémise
- HMS Artemis
- USS Artemis
