= USS Artemis =

Three ships of the United States Navy have been named Artemis after Artemis, the Olympian goddess known to the Romans as Diana.

- USS Artemis (SP-593), a patrol craft commissioned on 17 October 1917
- USS Artemis (ID-2187), a transport in commission during 1919
- USS Artemis (AKA-21), an attack cargo ship and lead ship of her class was laid down on 23 November 1943 and launched on 20 May 1944

== See also ==
- French ship Artémis
- French ship Artémise
- HMS Artemis
