= Artemiz =

Artemiz may refer to:

- Artemiz, an alternative name for Artemis, a goddess in the DC Comics Universe
- Iranian ship Artemiz, a destroyer, formerly HMS Sluys

== See also ==
- Artemis (disambiguation)
