= Artemas Martin =

American mathematician (1835–1918)

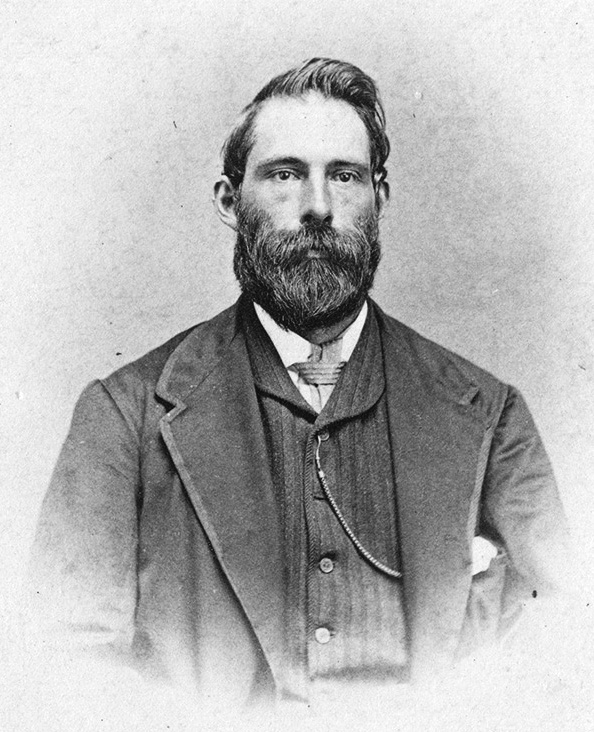
- Born: August 3, 1835; Steuben County, New York
- Died: November 7, 1918 (aged 83); Washington, DC, U.S.
- Awards: Honorary Degrees
- Scientific career
- Fields: Mathematics, puzzles, diophantine analysis
- Institutions: U.S. Coast Survey

Artemas Martin (August 3, 1835 – November 7, 1918) was a self-educated American mathematician.

== Biography ==
Martin was born on August 3, 1835, in Steuben County, New York, grew up in Venango County, Pennsylvania, and spent most of his life in Erie County, Pennsylvania. He was home-schooled until the age of 14, when he began studying mathematics at the local school, later moving to the Franklin Select School a few miles away and then to the Franklin Academy, finishing his formal education at age approximately 20. He worked as a farmer, oil driller, and schoolteacher. In 1881, he declined an invitation to become a professor of mathematics at the Normal School in Missouri. In 1885, he became the librarian for the Survey Office of the United States Coast Guard, and in 1898 he became a computer in the Division of Tides. He died on November 7, 1918.

== Mathematical work ==
Martin was a prolific contributor of problems and solutions to mathematical puzzle columns in popular magazines beginning at the age of 18 in the Pittsburgh Almanac and the Philadelphia Saturday Evening Post. From 1870 to 1875, he was editor of the "Stairway Department" of Clark's School Visitor, one of the magazines to which he had previously contributed. From 1875 to 1876 Martin moved to the Normal Monthly, where he published 16 articles on diophantine analysis. He subsequently became editor of the Mathematical Visitor in 1877 and of the Mathematical Magazine in 1882. In 1893 in Chicago, his paper On fifth-power numbers whose sum is a fifth power was read (but not by him) at the International Mathematical Congress held in connection with the World's Columbian Exposition. He was an Invited Speaker of the ICM in 1912 in Cambridge UK.

Martin maintained an extensive mathematical library, now in the collections of American University.

== Awards and societies ==
In 1877 Martin was given an honorary M.A. from Yale University. In 1882 he was awarded another honorary degree, a Ph.D. from Rutgers University, and his third honorary degree, an LL.D., was given to him in 1885 by Hillsdale College. He was elected to the London Mathematical Society in 1878, the Société Mathématique de France in 1884, the Edinburgh Mathematical Society in 1885, the Philosophical Society of Washington in 1886, the American Association for the Advancement of Science in 1890, and the New York Mathematical Society in 1891. He was also a member of the American Mathematical Society, the Circolo Matematico di Palermo, the Mathematical Association of England, and the Deutsche Mathematiker-Vereinigung.
