= MV Artemis =

A number of motor vessels have been named Artemis, including:

- MV Artemis (1977), a bulk carrier
- MV Artemis (1984), a cruise ship

== See also ==
- SS Artemis for steamships named Artemis
