= SS Empire Bittern =

World War II merchant ship of the United Kingdom

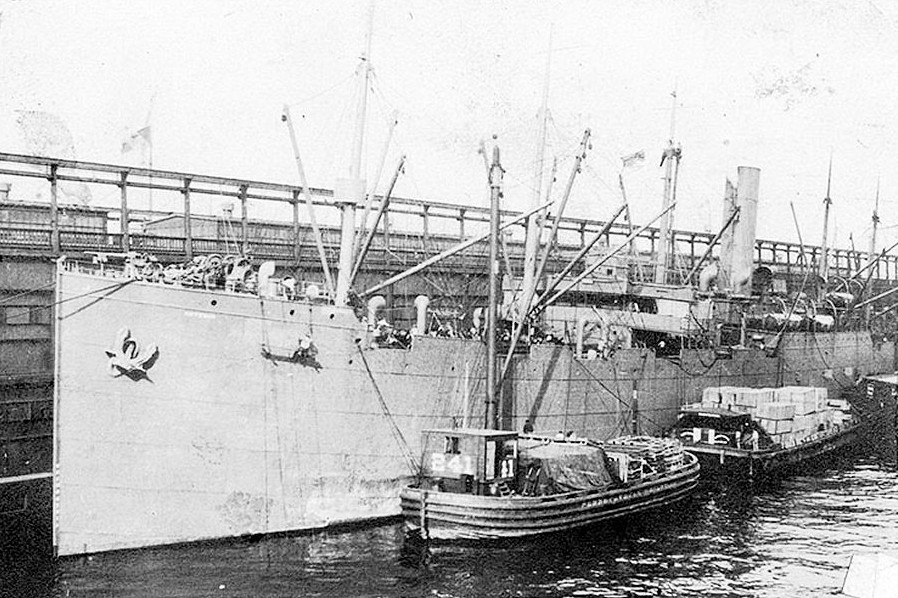
- Artemis (U.S. Shipping Board Transport, 1917–1919) in port during or immediately after World War I

History
- Name: Iowa (1902–1913); Bohemia (1913–1917); Artemis (1917–1941); Empire Bittern (1941–1944)
- Namesake: State of Iowa, Kingdom of Bohemia, goddess Artemis, and bittern, a bird
- Owner: White Diamond Steamship Co Ltd (1902-13); Hamburg America Line (1913–1917); United States Shipping Board (1917–1934); United States Maritime Commission (1934–1941); Ministry of War Transport (1941–1944)
- Operator: George Warren & Co Ltd (1902–1913); United States Navy (1919); Royal Mail Lines Ltd (1941–1944)
- Port of registry: (United Kingdom of Great Britain and Ireland) Liverpool (1902–1913); (Germany) Hamburg (1913–1917); (United States) New York (1917–1941); (United Kingdom) London (1941–1944)
- Builder: Harland & Wolff, Belfast
- Yard number: 349
- Launched: 5 July 1902
- Completed: 11 November 1902
- Acquired: by the US Shipping Board in April 1917; allocated to the US Navy 23 February 1919 (USSB ownership)
- Commissioned: 8 April 1919 as USS Artemis (ID-2187) at Hoboken, New Jersey
- Decommissioned: 18 October 1919 at Brooklyn
- Stricken: By the U.S. Navy 18 October 1919
- Identification: British official number 115329 (1902–1913, 1941–1944); US official number 215315 (1917–41); code letters: TRJC (1902–1913); RTWD (1913–1917); LHMG (1917–1941); call sign: BCGL (1941–1944)
- Captured: Seized by the US in 1917
- Fate: Sunk as a blockship in Normandy in 1944
- Notes: Laid up about 1923, "abandoned" out of registry 1933, transferred UK 1941.

General characteristics
- Type: Cargo ship and livestock carrier
- Tonnage: 8,370 GRT, 5,361 NRT (Iowa 1909); 8,414 GRT
- Displacement: 17,837 long tons (18,123 t)
- Length: 500.5 ft (152.6 m)
- Beam: 58.3 ft (17.8 m)
- Draft: 27 ft (8.2 m)
- Depth: 34.0 ft (10.4 m)
- Installed power: 814 NHP
- Propulsion: 2 × 3-cylinder triple expansion steam engine; 2 × shafts
- Speed: 12 knots (22 km/h; 14 mph)
- Complement: Navy only: 329 officers and enlisted; Civilian crewed other than April—October 1919
- Armament: 1 × 3 in (76 mm) gun; 1 × 5 in (127 mm) gun (Artemis USSB transport, unarmed naval service)

Empire Bittern was a steamship, built as a livestock-carrying cargo ship in 1902 at Belfast, Ireland as Iowa for the White Diamond Steamship Company Ltd of Liverpool. The ship was sold to the Hamburg America Line and renamed Bohemia in 1913.

The German ship was seized by U.S. Customs at New York City at the start of American involvement in World War I, title transferred to the United States Shipping Board (USSB) and renamed Artemis. (Note: For other ships with the same name, see USS Artemis.) She was the USSB United States Army Chartered Transport USACT Artemis under time charter to the Army from 1917 to war's end. (Note: Army's owned hulls or bareboat charter under full Army control and operation were termed U.S. Army Transport (USAT) with other chartered hulls during the First World War being distinguished as United States Army Chartered Transport (U.S.A.C.T.). Contemporary references the ship use USACT Artemis. No such prefix was used for allocated ships without Army operation and crews during World War II.) The ship's last Army chartered voyage reached New York on 23 February 1919. The ship was transferred to the Navy and commissioned 8 April 1919 as USS Artemis with the designation ID-2187. On 18 October 1919 the ship was decommissioned and transferred back to the USSB (later the United States Maritime Commission (USMC)). Converted to cargo only, Artemis was a merchant ship until about 1923. The ship was laid up still showing in the U.S. register until 1933 when listed among the ships dropped from the register due to abandonment for age and deterioration.

With the World War II emergency in shipping the ship was transferred to the Ministry of War Transport (MoWT) in 1941, becoming one of the Empire ships, Empire Bittern. The ship was operated for MoWT by Royal Mail Lines Ltd. and made several Atlantic crossings in convoy. In July 1944 Empire Bittern was sunk as a blockship in support of Operation Overlord.

== Construction ==
Iowa was a steel-hulled, cargo steamship, specially fitted for carrying livestock, and built as yard number 349 by Harland & Wolff Ltd at Belfast. She was launched on 5 July 1902 and completed on 11 November 1902. Iowa, a three deck with shelter deck ship, measured 8,370 GRT, 5,361 NRT and was 500.5 ft (152.6 m) long, with a beam of 58.3 ft (17.8 m) and a depth of 34.0 ft (10.4 m). She was powered by a pair of 3-cylinder triple expansion steam engines, made by the shipbuilders and which had cylinders of 23.5 in (60 cm), 39 in (99 cm) and 66 in (170 cm) diameter by 48 in (120 cm) stroke, totalling 814 NHP, driving twin screws and giving her a speed of 12 knots (22 km/h; 14 mph). She had five masts.

== Commercial service ==
Iowa was built for the White Diamond Steamship Company Ltd of Liverpool, a British-based business with its origins in the White Diamond Line, founded in Boston, Massachusetts by Enoch Train in 1843. It specialised in the livestock trade, particularly between Boston and Liverpool, and was operated under the management of George Warren & Co Ltd. On 19 November 1902, Iowa sailed from Liverpool on her maiden voyage. In 1904 White Diamond deployed Iowa to open a new route between Galveston and Liverpool, bringing large cargos of cotton. George Warren was planning his retirement in 1912 and negotiated the sale of White Diamond, the Warren trading name, and its four ships to British shipowners Furness Withy, which already had a number of other trans-Atlantic cargo services.

Furness Withy considered Iowa too large for their services and sold her in 1913 to the Hamburg America Line who renamed her Bohemia, and intended to convert her to an emigrant carrier with a capacity of 1200 passengers in steerage class. The transformation was begun at Harland & Wolff's shipyard in Southampton, but cancelled in February 1914. After the outbreak of World War I on 28 July 1914, many German and Austrian ships took refuge in neutral ports, including the United States. Bohemia arrived in New York on 15 August, reportedly flying the British ensign and disguised as a White Star liner in order to deceive British patrols.

== United States Shipping Board ==
After the United States entered World War I in April 1917, due to her German registry, Bohemia was seized by American customs authorities. Under a 30 June 1917 Executive Order the United States took possession and title to the seized enemy ships placing them in custody of the United States Shipping Board.

=== Wartime service ===
Bohemia was renamed Artemis, armed with a main battery of one 5 in (127 mm) and one 3 in (76 mm) gun, and placed in service as a USSB transport on time charter to the Army with no formal agreement beyond the time charter. The ship was manned by the USSB with full responsibility for operation. (Note: The Army's JAG determined the Army bore no responsibility for operation of the ship and that USSB was fully responsible.)

The ship was the United States Army Chartered Transport (U.S.A.C.T.) Artemis during World War I and for over three months after the war ended, including voyages carrying horses and mules. In at least one case the ship while in convoy used the guns to fire on a submarine but missed. Her guns were removed at Norfolk, Virginia, on 30 November 1918. On 22 January 1919 at St. Nazaire the ship grounded with the inquiry finding the ship's master made an error by anchoring too close to shore. The French tugs Nord and Commerce, without request, attempted to tow the ship but cast off without explanation. The board and Army Judge Advocate General (JAG) found that such an unrequested and casual attempt did not warrant a claim for salvage and that any charges related to the grounding paid by the Army were the responsibility of the USSB. Artemis completed her last voyage as an Army chartered transport at New York City on 23 February 1919.

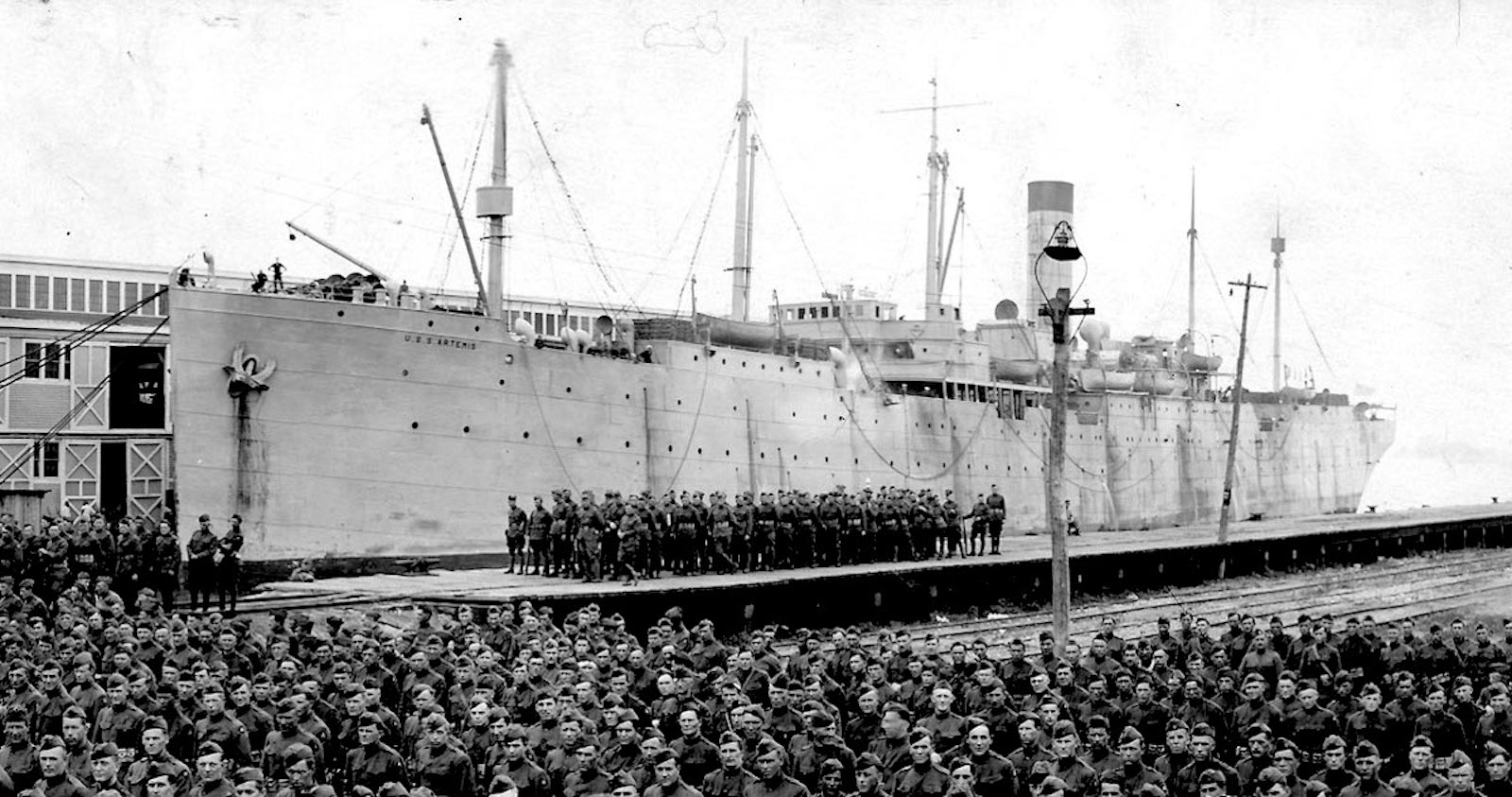
Artemis at Newport News after arriving from Europe with troops of the U.S. Army's 54th Pioneer Infantry Regiment on 26 June 1919

The Navy took control of Artemis at Fletcher's Drydock in Hoboken, New Jersey assigning the identification number (ID. No.) 2187 and placed the ship in commission on 8 April 1919 as the second ship bearing the name. The ship was assigned to the Cruiser and Transport Force sailing for France on 25 April reaching St. Nazaire on 8 May. Artemis left France for Newport News, Virginia on 11 May arriving on 24 May. The ship made a second voyage from Norfolk, Virginia on 1 June returning with troops and a cargo of trucks to Newport News arriving on 26 June. A third voyage left Norfolk on 2 July arriving St. Nazaire on 15 July and sailing from Brest on 21 July arriving at Norfolk on 3 August after which the ship underwent voyage repairs at Norfolk from 6–9 August. The ship's fourth and last voyage was to St. Nazaire arriving on 21 August and sailing for the return on 12 September arriving at pier 3, Army Base, Brooklyn on 23 September 1919. Artemis was decommissioned on 18 October 1919 at pier 2, Army Base. During her career as a Navy transport, she had brought home 11,760 troops. Her name was struck from the Naval Vessel Register on 18 October, and the ship was returned to the USSB.

=== Subsequent maritime career ===
Artemis was repaired and fitted for cargo only use and after additional repair work was allocated to the France and Canada Steamship Corporation for service as an animal transport. At the time of the report, closing 30 June 1920, the ship had made several trans-Atlantic voyages in that capacity.

Laid up by 1923, Artemis remained inactive through the 1930s and into World War II, in the hands of the USSB and its successor, the USMC. The vessel was dropped from the U.S. register in 1933 noted as "Abandoned" defined as abandoned "due to age or deterioration."

== World War II ==
Acquired by the Ministry of War Transport (MoWT) in 1941, the ship was renamed Empire Bittern. Her port of registry was London and she was operated under the management of Royal Mail Lines Ltd. Empire Bittern was a member of a number of convoys during World War II.

Convoy HX 189 left Halifax, Nova Scotia on 10 May 1942 and reached Liverpool on 20 May. Empire Bittern was to have joined the convoy, but did not sail, joining the following convoy, HX 190 instead. Convoy HX 190 left Halifax, Nova Scotia on 17 May 1942 and reached Liverpool on 28 May.

On 23 July 1944, as part of Operation Overlord, Empire Bittern was sunk as an additional breakwater ship to reinforce Gooseberry 3 for Mulberry "B" at Gold Beach near Arromanches-les-Bains.

== Identification ==
Official numbers are national ship identifiers. Iowa had the British official number 115329 and code letters TRJC until 1913, and then German code letters RTWD. From 1917 Artemis had the US official number 215315 and code letters LHMG. Empire Bittern regained official number 115329 and had the wireless telegraph call sign BCGL.
