= Artemis (crater) =

Crater on the Moon

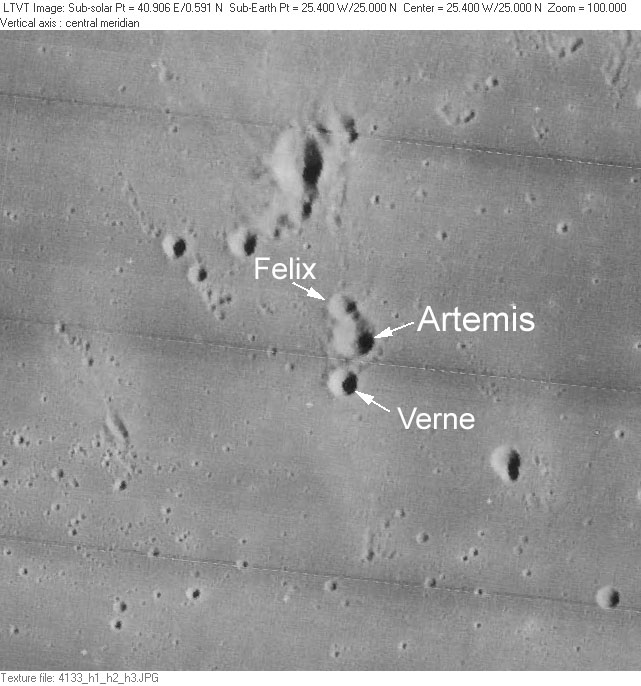
- Coordinates: 25.0°N 25.4°W
- Diameter: 2.28 km (1.42 mi)
- Colongitude: 336° at sunrise
- Eponym: Artemis

Artemis is a tiny lunar impact crater located in the Mare Imbrium. Craters of this dimension typically form cup-shaped excavations on the surface of the Moon. It lies near the midpoint between the craters Euler to the west and Lambert to the east. Just a few kilometers to the southeast is the even smaller Verne.

This crater is named after Artemis, a Greek goddess who symbolizes the Moon and a Greek female first name. Its designation was formally adopted by the International Astronomical Union in 1976.

== See also ==
- Mons La Hire – a solitary mountain to the north.
