= Temo Callahan =

American politician

A. K. (Temo) Callahan

Member of the Alabama House of Representatives
- In office 1930–1934
- In office 1947–1951
- In office 1955–1967

Personal details
- Born: May 18, 1904 Tuscaloosa, Alabama
- Died: May 19, 2001 (aged 97) Northport, Alabama
- Party: Democratic
- Education: University of Alabama
- Profession: lawyer

Artemas Killian Callahan, known as Temo Callahan, (May 18, 1904 – May 19, 2001) was a politician in the American state of Alabama.

Callahan was born in 1904 in Tuscaloosa. His name, Artemas Killian, was in honor of a doctor, Artemas Daniel Killian, that revived him when he died as an infant. He attended law school at the University of Alabama in 1926 and would go into practice in that same year. He would also serve as a license inspector and as assistant solicitor for Tuscaloosa County.

He was first elected to the Alabama House of Representatives in 1930, serving a single term until 1934. He would be re-elected on another four occasions, serving from 1947 to 1951, and 1955–67. He was a member of the House Interim Committee on Mental Health and the House Judiciary Committee. During his time in the house he was known as an advocate of the University of Alabama, Bryce Hospital, Partlow State School, and Tuscaloosa County's labor movement. He was also one of the legislators that passed a bill to help finance a hospital, in which he later served on its board of directors. As a lawyer, Callahan was one of the first in the area to include African Americans on his juries. After his service in the house, he would return to his law practice in which he would retire from in 1998, at the age of 94.

He married Marguerite Tarwater in 1942; with her he had two children. A Baptist by religion, he was an avid fiddle player, and a member of a musicians' union. He died at the age of 97 at a nursing home in 2001, one day after his birthday.
