= Artemas Libbey =

American judge (1823–1894)

Artemas Libbey (Libby in some sources; January 8, 1823 – March 15, 1894), of Augusta, Maine, was a justice of the Maine Supreme Judicial Court from April 24, 1875, to April 24, 1882, and again from January 11, 1883, to March 15, 1894.

Born in Freedom, Maine, Libbey's family moved to Albion, Maine in 1825, where he attended the local schools. He read law, first with Samuel S. Warren and then in the office of Z. Washburne of China, Maine, to be admitted to the bar in 1844. In 1852, he represented Augusta, Maine in the Maine House of Representatives.

He was a member of the Executive Council of Governor Samuel Wells, in 1856, and of the Constitutional Commission in 1875, to which he was appointed by Governor Nelson Dingley Jr. Although Libbey was a Democrat, he was appointed by Governor Dingley, a Republican, as an associate justice of the Maine Supreme Judicial Court on April 24, 1875. Libbey served until April 24, 1882, and was then reappointed on January 11, 1883, by Governor Frederick Robie, thereafter serving until his death, in Augusta, Maine.

Libbey had a wife and son.

Political offices
Preceded by Jonas Cutting; Seat vacant	Justice of the Maine Supreme Judicial Court; 1875–1882; 1883–1894	Succeeded by Seat vacant Sewall C. Strout
