= Hanover Schützenfest =

Marksmen's festival in Hannover, Germany

Coordinates: 52.362°N 9.729°E

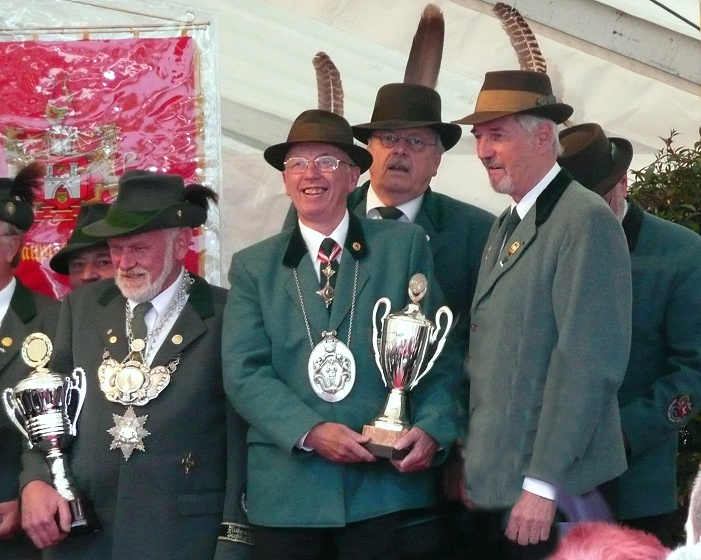
Award ceremony at the festival

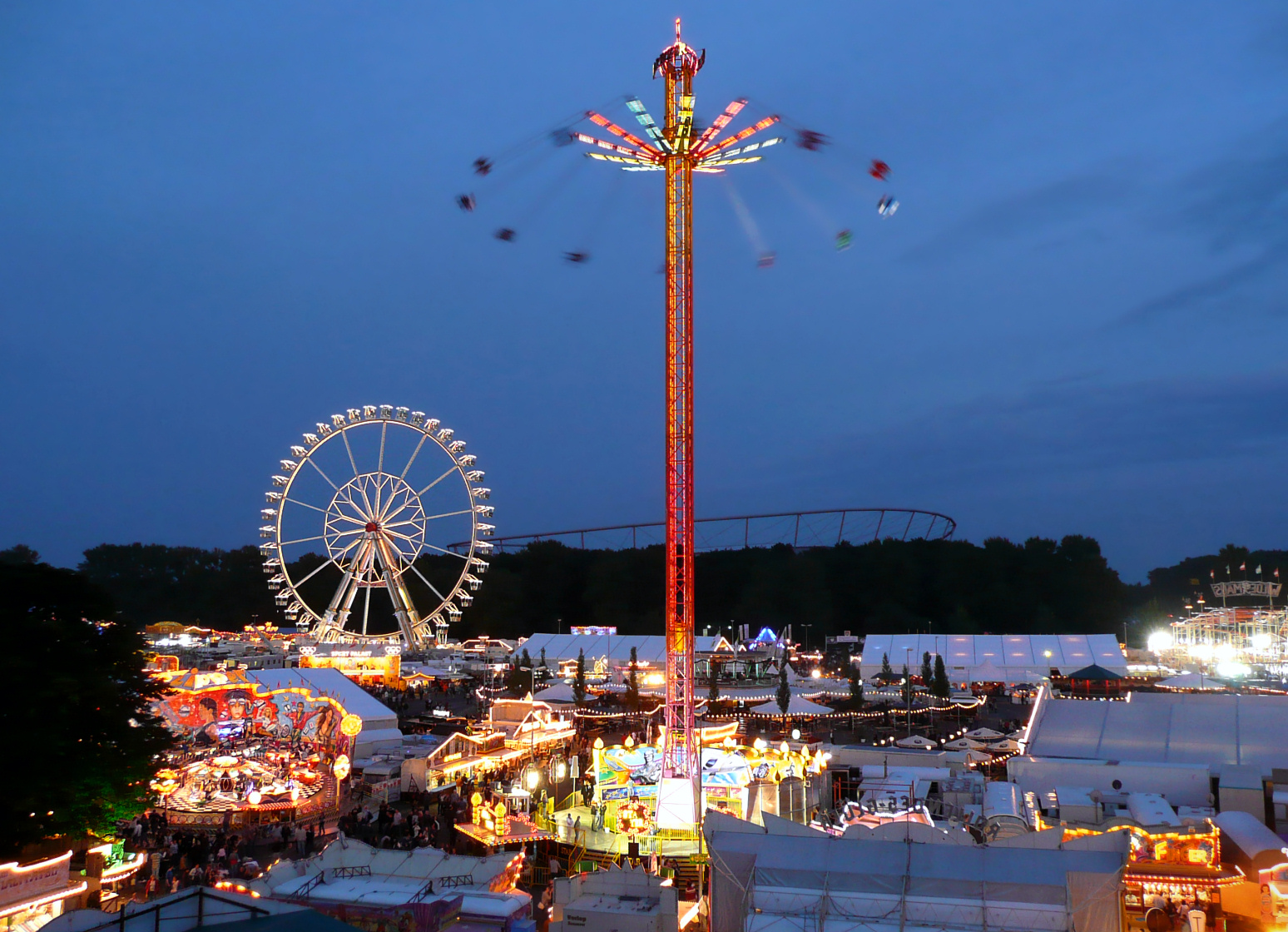
The festival at night

The Hanover Marksmen's Festival (German: Schützenfest Hannover) in Hanover, Lower Saxony is the largest marksmen's festival in the world. Founded in 1529 (497 years ago), the festival takes place once a year. It is commercially organized and includes a large entertainment program featuring 250 rides and booths, as well as 5 large beer tents.

A highlight of the festival is the 12-kilometre-long (7.5 mi) marksmen's parade comprising over 10,000 participants from Germany and all around the world, and featuring around 5,000 marksmen, over 100 marching and fanfare bands, and more than 60 wagons, carriages and floats. It is the longest parade in Europe, and perhaps the world. More than 1.5 million people visit the festival every year. The main landmark of the festival is the 60-metre-tall (200 ft) Steiger Ferris Wheel, which can carry 420 people in its 42-passenger cabins.

== See also ==
- Oktoberfest Hanover — second largest Oktoberfest in the world, with around 160 rides and inns, two large beer tents and around 1 million visitors each year
- Hanover also hosts one of the two largest Spring Festivals in Europe with around 160 rides and inns, 2 large beer tents and around 1 million visitors each year.
