= HMS Alderney (P416) =

Submarine

- HMS Alderney at Plymouth Sound in 1954.

History

United Kingdom
- Name: Alderney
- Builder: Vickers-Armstrongs, Barrow-in-Furness
- Laid down: 6 February 1945
- Launched: 25 June 1945
- Commissioned: 10 December 1946
- Decommissioned: November 1967
- Identification: Pennant number P416
- Fate: Sold to be broken up for scrap on 6 June 1972

General characteristics
- Class & type: Amphion-class submarine
- Displacement: 1,360/1,590 tons (surface/submerged)
- Length: 293 ft 6 in (89.46 m)
- Beam: 22 ft 4 in (6.81 m)
- Draught: 18 ft 1 in (5.51 m)
- Propulsion: 2 × 2,150 hp (1,600 kW) Admiralty ML 8-cylinder diesel engine, 2 × 625 hp (466 kW) electric motors for submergence driving two shafts
- Speed: 18.5 kn (34.3 km/h) surface, 8 kn (15 km/h) submerged
- Range: 10,500 nmi (19,400 km) at 11 kn (20 km/h) surfaced; 16 nmi (30 km) at 8 kn (15 km/h) or 90 nmi (170 km) at 3 kn (5.6 km/h) submerged
- Test depth: 350 ft (110 m)
- Complement: 60
- Armament: 6 × 21 inch (533 mm) (2 external)bow torpedo tube, 4 × 21 in (2 external) stern torpedo tube, containing a total of 20 torpedoes; Mines: 26; 1 × 4 in (102 mm) main deck gun, 3 × 0.303 machine gun, 1 × 20 mm AA Oerlikon 20 mm gun

HMS Alderney (P416/S66), was an Amphion-class submarine of the Royal Navy, built by Vickers-Armstrongs at Barrow and launched 25 June 1945 by Mrs Molly Wallis, wife of Sir Barnes Wallis. She was the 12th of the class and was scrapped in 1972.

== Design ==
Like all Amphion-class submarines, Alderney had a displacement of 1,360 long tons (1,380 t) when at the surface and 1,590 long tons (1,620 t) while submerged. She had a total length of 293 feet 6 inches (89.46 m), a beam of 22 feet 4 inches (6.81 m), and a draught of 18 feet 1 inch (5.51 m). The submarine was powered by two Admiralty ML eight-cylinder diesel engines generating a power of 2,150 horsepower (1,600 kW) each. She also contained four electric motors each producing 625 horsepower (466 kW) that drove two shafts. She could carry a maximum of 219 tonnes (241 short tons) of diesel, although she usually carried between 159 and 165 tonnes (175 and 182 short tons).

The submarine had a maximum surface speed of 18.5 knots (34.3 km/h; 21.3 mph) and a submerged speed of 8 knots (15 km/h; 9.2 mph). When submerged, she could operate at 3 knots (5.6 km/h; 3.5 mph) for 90 nautical miles (170 km; 100 mi) or at 8 knots (15 km/h; 9.2 mph) for 16 nautical miles (30 km; 18 mi). When surfaced, she was able to travel 15,200 nautical miles (28,200 km; 17,500 mi) at 10 knots (19 km/h; 12 mph) or 10,500 nautical miles (19,400 km; 12,100 mi) at 11 knots (20 km/h; 13 mph). She was fitted with ten 21 inches (530 mm) torpedo tubes, one QF 4 inch naval gun Mk XXIII, one Oerlikon 20 mm cannon, and a .303 British Vickers machine gun. Her torpedo tubes were fitted to the bow and stern, and she could carry twenty torpedoes. Her complement was sixty-one crew members.

== Operational service ==
Alderney completed three commissions between 1954 and 1963 with the 6th Submarine Squadron at Halifax, Nova Scotia, carrying out exercises with the Royal Canadian Navy and Royal Canadian Air Force. In September 1952 Artemis replaced the damaged Alderney, which had developed issues while training with vessels of the Royal Canadian Navy off Bermuda. She was modernised during a long refit in Portsmouth Dockyard between 1956 and 1958. In 1965 she recommissioned for the eighth time and was allocated to the 1st Submarine Squadron at HMS Dolphin. In 1965 and 1966 she was present at Portsmouth Navy Days. She was decommissioned in 1966 and was broken up at Troon, Scotland on 1 February 1970.

== Publications ==
- Colledge, J. J.; Warlow, Ben (2006) [1969]. Ships of the Royal Navy: The Complete Record of All Fighting Ships of the Royal Navy from the 15th Century to the Present (3rd Rev ed.). London: Chatham Publishing. ISBN 978-1-86176-281-8. OCLC 67375475.
