= Artemas, Pennsylvania =

Unincorporated community in Pennsylvania, US

- Unincorporated community
- Location within Pennsylvania
- Coordinates: 39°44′49″N 78°26′20″W
- Country: United States
- State: Pennsylvania
- County: Bedford
- Elevation: 974 ft (297 m)
- Time zone: UTC-5 (Eastern (EST))
  - Summer (DST): UTC-4 (EDT)
- ZIP code: 17211
- Area code: 814
- GNIS feature ID: 1168429

Artemas is an unincorporated community in Bedford County, Pennsylvania, United States. The community is 19 miles (31 km) south-southeast of Bedford. Artemas has a post office with ZIP code 17211, which opened on June 23, 1892.
