= Artemis (DC Comics) =

In the context of comic books published by DC Comics, Artemis may refer to one of three fictional characters:

- Artemis, the Olympian goddess of the hunt
- Artemis of Bana-Mighdall, an Amazon and a supporting character of Wonder Woman
- Artemis Crock, the daughter of supervillains Sportsmaster and Huntress
- Artemiz, a member of the Female Furies
