= HMS Artemis =

Submarine of the Royal Navy

History

United Kingdom
- Name: Artemis
- Builder: Scotts of Greenock
- Laid down: 28 February 1944
- Launched: 26 August 1946
- Commissioned: 15 August 1947
- Decommissioned: 1971
- Identification: Pennant number P449
- Fate: Sank 1 July 1971. Sold to Pounds of Portsmouth for scrap in 1972

General characteristics
- Class & type: Amphion-class submarine
- Displacement: 1,360/1,590 tons (surface/submerged)
- Length: 293 ft 6 in (89.46 m)
- Beam: 22 ft 4 in (6.81 m)
- Draught: 18 ft 1 in (5.51 m)
- Propulsion: 2 × 2,150 hp (1,600 kW) Admiralty ML 8-cylinder diesel engine, 2 × 625 hp (466 kW) electric motors for submergence driving two shafts
- Speed: 18.5 kn (34.3 km/h) surface, 8 kn (15 km/h) submerged; 10,500 nmi (19,400 km) at 11 kn (20 km/h) surfaced; 16 nmi (30 km) at 8 kn (15 km/h) or 90 nmi (170 km) at 3 kn (5.6 km/h) submerged
- Test depth: 350 ft (110 m)
- Complement: 60
- Armament: 6 × 21 inch (533 mm) (2 external) bow torpedo tubes, 4 × 21 in (2 external) stern torpedo tubes, containing a total of 20 torpedoes; Mines: 26; 1 × 4 in (102 mm) main deck gun, 3 × 0.303 machine gun, 1 × 20 mm AA Oerlikon 20 mm gun

HMS Artemis (P449) was an Amphion-class submarine of the Royal Navy, built by Scotts Shipbuilding & Engineering Co. of Greenock and launched 28 August 1946. The submarine sank while refueling in 1971, was raised and sold for breaking up in 1972.

== Design ==
Like all Amphion-class submarines, Artemis had a displacement of 1,360 long tons (1,380 t) when at the surface and 1,590 long tons (1,620 t) while submerged. She had a total length of 293 feet 6 inches (89.46 m), a beam of 22 feet 4 inches (6.81 m), and a draught of 18 feet 1 inch (5.51 m). The submarine was powered by two Admiralty ML eight-cylinder diesel engines generating a power of 2,150 horsepower (1,600 kW) each. She also contained four electric motors each producing 625 horsepower (466 kW) that drove two shafts. She could carry a maximum of 219 tonnes (241 short tons) of diesel, although she usually carried between 159 and 165 tonnes (175 and 182 short tons).

The submarine had a maximum surface speed of 18.5 knots (34.3 km/h; 21.3 mph) and a submerged speed of 8 knots (15 km/h; 9.2 mph). When submerged, she could operate at 3 knots (5.6 km/h; 3.5 mph) for 90 nautical miles (170 km; 100 mi) or at 8 knots (15 km/h; 9.2 mph) for 16 nautical miles (30 km; 18 mi). When surfaced, she was able to travel 15,200 nautical miles (28,200 km; 17,500 mi) at 10 knots (19 km/h; 12 mph) or 10,500 nautical miles (19,400 km; 12,100 mi) at 11 knots (20 km/h; 13 mph). She was fitted with ten 21 inches (530 mm) torpedo tubes, one QF 4 inch naval gun Mk XXIII, one Oerlikon 20 mm cannon, and a .303 British Vickers machine gun. Her torpedo tubes were fitted to the bow and stern, and she could carry twenty torpedoes. Her complement was sixty-one crew members.

== Service history ==
In September 1952 Artemis deployed to Canada a second time for anti-submarine training with the Royal Canadian Navy. Artemis replaced the damaged Alderney, which had developed issues while training with vessels of the Royal Canadian Navy off Bermuda. In 1953 she took part in the Fleet Review to celebrate the Coronation of Queen Elizabeth II.

On 1 July 1971 Artemis sank in 18 feet (5.5 m) of water while moored at the shore establishment HMS Dolphin at Gosport during refuelling. The sub dipped by the stern (she was being prepared for fuelling using the aft externals) which filled and the sub sank. All aboard escaped, with decisive action by four crew members resulting in bravery awards. She was raised on 6 July and decommissioned, sold to be broken up for scrap on 12 December 1971.

== Publications ==
- Colledge, J. J.; Warlow, Ben (2006) [1969]. Ships of the Royal Navy: The Complete Record of All Fighting Ships of the Royal Navy from the 15th Century to the Present (3rd Rev ed.). London: Chatham Publishing. ISBN 978-1-86176-281-8. OCLC 67375475.
