= List of shipwrecks in September 1889 =

The list of shipwrecks in September 1889 includes ships sunk, foundered, grounded, or otherwise lost during September 1889.

== 1 September ==
List of shipwrecks: 1 September 1889
| Ship | State | Description |
|---|---|---|
| Asia | Denmark | The steamship struck the Bridges Rocks, off Cape Cornwall, United Kingdom and sank with the loss of two of the 22 people on board. She was on a voyage from Cardiff, Glamorgan, United Kingdom to Copenhagen. |
| Eclipse, and Maitlands | United Kingdom | The steamships collided and were both severely damaged. Both vessels put in to Copenhagen. |
| Paris | United Kingdom | The steamship was driven ashore 4 nautical miles (7.4 km) east of Calais, France. She was on a voyage from Dover, Kent to Calais. She was refloated with the assistance of three tugs. |
| Redewater | United Kingdom | The steamship was damaged by an onboard explosion off the mouth of the River Tyne. |
| Renner | Denmark | The schooner capsized and was severely damaged at Northfleet, Kent, United Kingdom. |
| Robert | Germany | The ship was sighted whilst on a voyage from Quebec City, Canada to Sligo, United Kingdom. No further trace, reported missing. |
| Telesilla | United Kingdom | The steamship ran aground on Saltholmen, Denmark. She was on a voyage from Kronstadt, Russia to Sutton Bridge, Lincolnshire. |

== 2 September ==
List of shipwrecks: 2 September 1889
| Ship | State | Description |
|---|---|---|
| Glamorganshire | United Kingdom | The steamship was driven ashore near Ismalia, Ottoman Empire. She was on a voyage from Middlesbrough, Yorkshire to Yokohama, Japan. |

== 3 September ==
List of shipwrecks: 3 September 1889
| Ship | State | Description |
|---|---|---|
| Rosalind | United Kingdom | The ship departed from Colón, Columbia for Laguna. No further trace, reported missing. |

== 4 September ==
List of shipwrecks: 4 September 1889
| Ship | State | Description |
|---|---|---|
| Ashdell | United Kingdom | The steamship was wrecked on a reef off Puerto Rico. Her crew were rescued. |
| Circe | United Kingdom | The schooner foundered at Saint Kitts. Her crew were ashore. |
| Lucretia | United States | The whaler, a barque, was wrecked on an uncharted reef in the Chukchi Sea 7 nautical miles (13 km; 8.1 mi) west of Herald Island off the coast of Siberia, Russia. The steam barque Abram Barker (United States) rescued her crew. |
| Roraima | United Kingdom | The steamship was driven ashore and wrecked on Saint Kitts. Her nineteen crew were rescued by rocket apparatus. She was on a voyage from London to Saint Kitts. |
| Violet | France | The schooner was wrecked at Martinique with the loss of two lives. |
| Several unnamed vessels | Flags unknown | Several hulks and lighters were driven ashore at Saint Thomas, Virgin Islands. |

== 5 September ==
List of shipwrecks: 5 September 1889
| Ship | State | Description |
|---|---|---|
| Earnmoor | United Kingdom | The steamship sank in a hurricane in the Atlantic Ocean north east of the Greater Antilles with the loss of seventeen of her 24 crew. The seven survivors floated in an open lifeboat for 21 days before the schooner Mosquito (United States) rescued them off Cape Hatteras, North Carolina, United States. Earnmoor was on a voyage from Baltimore, Maryland, United States to Rio de Janeiro, Brazil. |
| Katie | United Kingdom | The schooner was run into by the steamship Richmond (United Kingdom) off the coast of Cornwall and was severely damaged. Katie was on a voyage from Runcorn, Cheshire to Hayle, Cornwall. She was towed in to Hayle. |
| Loch Nell | United Kingdom | The steamship was driven ashore on Holy Isle, in the Firth of Clhyde. She was refloated in mid-September and beached for temporary repairs with the intention of taking her in to Bowling, Dunbartonshire. |

== 6 September ==
List of shipwrecks: 6 September 1889
| Ship | State | Description |
|---|---|---|
| Albatross | United Kingdom | The barque was abandoned in the Atlantic Ocean. Her crew took to the boats; they were rescued several days later by a Canadian barque. She was on a voyage from Greenock, Renfrewshire to Buenos Aires, Argentina. |
| Flying Venus | United Kingdom | The ship was wrecked on Penrhyn Island with the loss of six of the 31 people on board. She was on a voyage from Port Townsend, Washington, United States to Australia. Survivors were rescued on by the steamship Richmond (Flag unknown) on 24 October |
| Indrani | United Kingdom | The steamship was damaged by debris from the explosion of a factory at Antwerp, Belgium. |
| Lady Gladys | United Kingdom | The barque was severely damaged by debris from the explosion of a factory at Antwerp. |

== 7 September ==
List of shipwrecks: 7 September 1889
| Ship | State | Description |
|---|---|---|
| Robert Aarveld | Norway | The ship was last sighted on this date. She was on a voyage from Quebec, Canada to Sligo, United Kingdom. No further trace, posted missing. |

== 8 September ==
List of shipwrecks: 8 September 1889
| Ship | State | Description |
|---|---|---|
| Juno | Germany | The barque was destroyed by fire off False Cape Horn, Chile. Her crew were rescued. |

== 9 September ==
List of shipwrecks: 9 September 1889
| Ship | State | Description |
|---|---|---|
| Annie Davey | United Kingdom | The ship collided with the steamship Volo (Spain) in the River Mersey and was beached. Annie Davey was on a voyage from Rye, Sussex to the Weston Point Docks, Cheshire. |
| Falmouth Castle | United Kingdom | The steamship collided with the steamship Roseland (United Kingdom) at St. Mawes, Cornwall and was beached. |
| Jarno | Austria-Hungary | The barque was abandoned in the Atlantic Ocean 600 nautical miles (1,100 km) off the coast of Maryland, United States with the loss of three of her twelve crew. Survivors were rescued by the steamship Carolina (Spain). Jarno was on a voyage from Pensacola, Florida, United States to Tunis, Tunisia. |
| 'Parthenia | United Kingdom | The barquentine was run into by the barque Mendosa (Flag unknown) at Cardiff. Glamorgan and was damaged. |

== 10 September ==
List of shipwrecks: 10 September 1889
| Ship | State | Description |
|---|---|---|
| Alena | United States | The schooner was driven ashore on the Delaware Breakwater during a hurricane. |
| Alpha | United Kingdom | The North Shields steam trawler sank off Spurn Head, following a collision with the schooner Lottie of Padstow. The crew were saved. |
| Atalanta | Flag unknown | The barque was driven ashore on the American coast during a hurricane. |
| Bidsie & Bell | United Kingdom | The schooner collided with the steamship Volo (Spain) in the River Mersey and was damaged. |
| Byrona | United Kingdom | The schooner was driven ashore at Philadelphia, Pennsylvania, United States during a hurricane. |
| Byron M | United Kingdom | The schooner was driven ashore on the Delaware Breakwater during a hurricane. |
| Covert | United States | The schooner was driven ashore on the Delaware Breakwater during a hurricane. |
| Henry M. Clarke | United Kingdom | The schooner was driven ashore on the Delaware Breakwater during a hurricane. |
| Loyalist | United Kingdom | The brig was driven ashore at Philadelphia during a hurricane. |
| Mary Emily | United Kingdom | The barque was wrecked at Durban, Natal Colony with the loss of all ten people on board. |
| Richard T. Green | Flag unknown | The ship was driven ashore at Philadelphia during a hurricane. |
| Thomas Keillor | Flag unknown | The ship was driven ashore on the Delaware Breakwater during a hurricane. She was on a voyage from Philadelphia to London, United Kingdom. She was later refloated. |
| W. R. Grace | United States | The ship was driven ashore on the American coast during a hurricane. Her crew were rescued. |
| Unnamed | United Kingdom | The wherry collided with the tug Wizard (United Kingdom) at South Shields, County Durham and was beached. Also reported that Wizard was run into by a wherry and was beached. |
| 29 unnamed vessels | Flags unknown | The ships were driven ashore and wrecked in Delaware Bay in a hurricane with the loss of 31 lives. |
| Unnamed vessels | Flags unknown | A number of ships were driven ashore and wrecked on the cost of New Jersey, United States during a hurricane with the loss of a number of lives. |
| Unnamed | Flag unknown | The ship was wrecked in Chesapeake Bay in a hurricane. |
| Four unnamed vessels | Flags unknown | The ships were wrecked in Long Island Sound in a hurricane. |
| 24 Unnamed vessels | Flags unknown | The ships were driven ashore at the Delaware Capes. One hundred and ninety people were rescued. |

== 11 September ==
List of shipwrecks: 11 September 1889
| Ship | State | Description |
|---|---|---|
| Alexandre | United Kingdom | The steamship collided with one of the piers of London Bridge and was damaged. She was on a voyage from Clacton-on-Sea, Essex to London. Her 300 passengers were taken off. She consequently sank the next day. Alexandre was declared a total loss. |
| Ardencaple | United Kingdom | The steamship put in to Mauritius on fire. She was on a voyage from Calcutta, India to London. |
| Elisa Lines | Norway | The barque was abandoned in the Atlantic Ocean. Her crew were rescued by Edith Mary (flag unknown). Elisa Lines was on a voyage from Pensacola, Florida, United States to Montevideo, Uruguay. She was subsequently towed in to New York. |
| Freya | Norway | The barque capsized in the Atlantic Ocean off Cape Henlopen, Delaware, United States. She was on a voyage from London to Savannah, Georgia, United States. |
| Hungarian | United Kingdom | The steamship was driven ashore at Rue Point, Rathlin Island, County Donegal. She was on a voyage from the Clyde to Jamaica. She was refloated on 15 September and beached in Church Bay. |
| James | United Kingdom | The ketch struck the Goldstone and foundered in the North Sea off the coast of Northumberland. Her crew survived. She was on a voyage from London to Leith, Lothian. |
| Triton | United Kingdom | The steamship ran aground and sank off St. Govan's Head, Pembrokeshire. Her crew survived. She was on a voyage from Burry Port, Glamorgan to Belfast, County Antrim. |
| Victoria | United Kingdom | The steamboat struck the foundation of one of the piers of London Bridge and was holed. She was beached. All 200 passengers were rescued. |

== 12 September ==
List of shipwrecks: 12 September 1889
| Ship | State | Description |
|---|---|---|
| Banshee, and Irene | United Kingdom | The paddle steamer Banshee was run into by the steamship Irene 30 nautical miles (56 km) off Holyhead, Anglesey and was severely damaged. Banshee was on a voyage from Dublin to Holyhead. She was escorted in to Holyhead by Irene. Irene was severely damaged. She was on a voyage from Holyhead to Dublin. |
| Thunder | United Kingdom | The steamship sank off Broad Haven, Pembrokeshire. Her crew survived. |

== 13 September ==
List of shipwrecks: 13 September 1889
| Ship | State | Description |
|---|---|---|
| Myra, and Rothesay | Canada | The tug Myra and the passenger ship Rothesay collided in the Saint Lawrence River 1 nautical mile (1.9 km) upstream of Prescott, Ontario. Both vessels were severely damaged. Myra sank with the loss of two of her crew. Rothesay was beached. Her 60 passengers were rescued. She was on a voyage from Gananoque to Prescott. |
| Ruth | United Kingdom | The fishing lugger was driven ashore and wrecked at Eastbourne, Sussex. |

== 15 September ==
List of shipwrecks: 15 September 1889
| Ship | State | Description |
|---|---|---|
| Island Belle | United States | The schooner was wrecked on the southern shore of Delarof Harbor (55°10′30″N 160°30′00″W) on the coast of Unga Island in the Shumagin Islands in the District of Alaska. Her four crew survived. |
| Queen of the Isles | United Kingdom | The steamship was holed when her propeller shaft broke and sank in the Irish Sea off the Bahama Lightship ( Trinity House). Her crew were rescued. |

== 16 September ==
List of shipwrecks: 16 September 1889
| Ship | State | Description |
|---|---|---|
| Leo | United States | The naptha launch was destroyed by fire between Loraine and Cleveland, Ohio. Lost with all hands. |
| HMS Lily | Royal Navy | The Arab-class gunvessel was wrecked off Point Amour Lighthouse, Labrador, Newfoundland Colony with the loss of seven lives. |
| South American | United States | The ship was wrecked in Struys Bay. Seven of her crew refused to abandon her. She was on a voyage from Yloilo, Spanish East Indies to New York. |
| Torpedo boat No. 9 | Royal Danish Navy | The torpedo boat ran aground in the Øresund. She was refloated on 18 September, subsequently returned to service. |

== 18 September ==
List of shipwrecks: 18 September 1889
| Ship | State | Description |
|---|---|---|
| Caroline | United Kingdom | The steamship ran aground in the River Medway. She was on a voyage from Calais, France to Rochester, Kent. She was refloated on 21 September and completed her voyage. |
| Maggie Douglas | United Kingdom | The steamship departed from Mobile, Alabama, United States for Queenborough, Kent. No further trace, reported missing. |
| Robert Gaskin | Flag unknown | The ship sank in the Saint Lawrence River near Brookville, Ontario, Canada whilst attempting to refloat the train ferry William Armstrong (Flag unknown). |

== 19 September ==
List of shipwrecks: 19 September 1889
| Ship | State | Description |
|---|---|---|
| Florence | United Kingdom | The cargo ship foundered after taking water in a gale off the Calf of Man, Isle of Man, with the loss of eleven of her twelve crew. The survivor was rescued from the ship's boat by steamer King Orry ( (United Kingdom of Great Britain and Ireland) Isle of Man). |
| Helmsley | United Kingdom | The steamship was driven ashore at Limehouse, London. |
| Kepler | Germany | The barque departed from Singapore for Hong Kong. No further trace, reported missing. |

== 20 September ==
List of shipwrecks: 20 September 1889
| Ship | State | Description |
|---|---|---|
| Samuel Laing | United Kingdom | The steamship sank at Limehouse, London. |
| Sarah C. Pyle | United States | The schooner parted her anchor cable and drifted ashore at Matinicus Isle, Maine, a total loss. Her crew were rescued. |

== 21 September ==
List of shipwrecks: 21 September 1889
| Ship | State | Description |
|---|---|---|
| Barone Podesta | Italy | The barque was abandoned in the Atlantic Ocean (40°10′N 71°25′W). Her thirteen crew were rescued by the steamship City of Brooklyn (United Kingdom). Barone Podesta was on a voyage from Pensacola, Florida, United States to Saint-Nazaire, Loire-Inférieure, France. She came ashore on No Man's Land, Massachusetts, United States in early October. She was a total loss. |
| Nashua | United States | The steamship caught fire at New York. |

== 22 September ==
List of shipwrecks: 22 September 1889
| Ship | State | Description |
|---|---|---|
| Bessie | United Kingdom | The steam launch became waterlogged off the Tongue Lightship ( Trinity House) and was abandoned by the crewman on board. He was rescued by the tug Bantam Cock (United Kingdom), which was towing her from Ramsgate, Kent to London. Bessie was beached in Holehaven Creek. |
| Emma, and Letitia | Germany; United Kingdom | The brig Emma collided with the schooner Letitia off Folkestone, Kent. Both vessels were severely damaged and were towed in to Dover, Kent. Emma was on a voyage from Luleå, Sweden to Cardiff, Glamorgan. |
| Hampshire | United Kingdom | The ship departed from Bangor, Maine, United States for Bowling, Dunbartonshire. No further trace, reported missing. |
| Perseverance | United Kingdom | The schooner was driven ashore near Penmon, Anglesey. She was on a voyage from Laxey, Isle of Man to Kingstown, County Dublin. She was refloated and put in to Bangor, Caernarfonshire in a leaky condition. |
| Zulette | United Kingdom | The barque was wrecked on the Scottish coast with the loss of six of her crew. Survivors were rescued by the barque Minnie Swift ( Canada). |

== 23 September ==
List of shipwrecks: 23 September 1889
| Ship | State | Description |
|---|---|---|
| Chanticleer | United Kingdom | The steamship departed from Blyth, Northumberland for Sölvesborg, Sweden. No further trace, reported missing. |
| Elipse | United Kingdom | The steamship struck the quayside at Kronstadt, Russia and was damaged. She was on a voyage from Copenhagen, Denmark to Kronstadt. |

== 24 September ==
List of shipwrecks: 24 September 1889
| Ship | State | Description |
|---|---|---|
| C. M. Gifford | United States | The tow steamer, towing Chas. E. Wyman (United States), was capsized by the towline in Lake Huron between Cheboygan and Cross Village, Michigan. One crewman died. |

== 25 September ==
List of shipwrecks: 25 September 1889
| Ship | State | Description |
|---|---|---|
| Haabets | Norway | The brig was abandoned in the North Sea 100 nautical miles (190 km) off Spurn Point, Yorkshire, United Kingdom, being in a sinking condition. She was on a voyage from Hull, Yorkshire to Veile, Denmark. |
| Japan | United Kingdom | The steamship caught fire at Hong Kong. The fire was extinguished. |
| Ninita | United Kingdom | The sloop foundered at sea. Her crew were rescued by Haabet (Norway). |

== 26 September ==
List of shipwrecks: 26 September 1889
| Ship | State | Description |
|---|---|---|
| Arbutus | United Kingdom | The steamship ran aground at Aberdeen. She was refloated. |
| Circassian | United Kingdom | The steamship ran aground off Longue Point, Quebec, Canada. She was refloated and resumed her voyage. |
| Engelhorn | United Kingdom | The ship ran aground on being launched at Whitehaven, Cumberland. She was refloated on 5 October. |
| Melangen | United Kingdom | The brig was abandoned in the North Sea 150 nautical miles (280 km) off Spurn Point, Yorkshire, United Kingdom. Her crew were rescued by the smack Etonian (United Kingdom). Melangen was on a voyage from Härnösand, Sweden to Leith, Lothian, United Kingdom. |
| Merrimac | United Kingdom | The paddle steamer ran aground under the Clifton Suspension Bridge, Bristol, Gloucestershire. She was on a voyage from Bristol to Chepstow, Monmouthshire. |
| Norge | Norway | The barque was abandoned in the Atlantic Ocean. Her crew were rescued by Star of Bengal (United Kingdom). Norge was on a voyage from Grangemouth, Stirlingshire, United Kingdom to Montevideo, Uruguay. |

== 27 September ==
List of shipwrecks: 27 September 1889
| Ship | State | Description |
|---|---|---|
| Alina | Norway | The barque collided with the pier at South Shields, County Durham and was severely damaged. |
| Amana | United Kingdom | The full-rigged ship was driven ashore at the mouth of the Great Fish River, Cape Colony. All on board were rescued by the Port Alfred Lifeboat. She was on a voyage from Rangoon, Burma to a South American port. She was refloated and put in to Port Elizabeth. |
| Angelo, and Hansa | United Kingdom; Germany | The steamships Angelo and Hansacollided at Hull, Yorkshire. Angelo was beached. She was on a voyage from Hull to Christiania, Norway. She was refloated the next day. Hansa was on a voyage from Hull to Hamburg. She put back to Hull with severe damage to her bow. |
| Dragoman | United Kingdom | The steamship collided with the steamship Mona (United Kingdom) in the River Thames near Barking, Essex and was damaged. Dragoman was on a voyage from London to Cardiff, Glamorgan. She put back to London. |
| Hollandschdiep | Netherlands | The dredger was run down and sunk at Harlingen, Friesland by the steamship Windsor (United Kingdom). |
| Llanelly | United Kingdom | The steamship ran aground off St Bees Head, Cumberland. She was on a voyage from Swansea, Glamorgan to Maryport, Cumberland. She was refloated and found to be severely leaky. |
| Mountaineer | United Kingdom | The steamship ran aground off Oban, Argyllshire. Her 50 passengers were taken off. |

== 28 September ==
List of shipwrecks: 28 September 1889
| Ship | State | Description |
|---|---|---|
| Claudia | United Kingdom | The ship departed from Newport, Monmouthshire for Galway. No further trace, reported overdue. |
| Endeavour | United Kingdom | The smack was run into by the steamship Suders (Flag unknown) and sunk on the Beacham Sands, in the North Sea off the coast of Lincolnshire. Her crew survived. |
| Harvey | United Kingdom | The yacht ran aground on the Gunfleet Sand, in the North Sea off the coast of Essex. She was refloated and taken in to Southend, Essex in a leaky condition. |
| Lancashire Lass, and No. 9 | United Kingdom; Netherlands | The schooner Lancashire Lass collided with the pilot boat No. 9 and sank in the English Channel off Dungeness, Kent. Her crew were rescued by No. 9, which put in to Dover, Kent in a severely damaged condition. |
| Loch Garry | United Kingdom | The steamship was driven ashore at Korsør, Denmark. She was on a voyage from Burntisland, Fife to Korsør. She was refloated and taken in to port. |
| Olaf Kyrre | Netherlands | The steamship ran aground and sank near Bergen, Norway. She was on a voyage from Bergen to Rotterdam, South Holland. |
| Osprey | United Kingdom | The steam yacht was run down and sunk in the Clyde by the steamship Madge Wildfire (United Kingdom) with the loss of three of the four people on board. |
| Wetherall | United Kingdom | The ketch was wrecked near Peterhead, Aberdeenshire with the loss of two of her three crew. |

== 29 September ==
List of shipwrecks: 29 September 1889
| Ship | State | Description |
|---|---|---|
| Arethusa | United Kingdom | The ship caught fire in the Atlantic Ocean. She was on a voyage from the River Tyne to Valparaíso, Chile. She was abandoned on 2 October 26 nautical miles (48 km) off the Falkland Islands. Her crew took to two boats; one boat landed at Port Stanley a week later. Her captain died of frostbite on 11 October. Those in the other boat were rescued on 12 October by the steamship Lady Octavia (United Kingdom). A crew member had died by the time they were rescued and two more subsequently died. |
| Celestine | France | The schooner sprang a leak and sank in the Bristol Channel 6 nautical miles (11 km) off the Mumbles, Glamorgan, United Kingdom. Her crew were rescued. She was on a voyage from Newport, Monmouthshire, United Kingdom to Lorient, Morbihan. |
| Linnet | United Kingdom | The fishing vessel was driven ashore at Scarborough, Yorkshire. Her six crew were rescued by the Scarborough Lifeboat. |
| Murton | United Kingdom | The steamship ran aground on the Stag Bank, in the Bristol Channel off Llanelly, Glamorgan. She was refloated and taken in to Llanelly. |
| Zephyr | United Kingdom | The steamship sprang a leak and foundered in the Bristol Channel off Lundy Island, Devon. Eleven of the eighteen people on board took to a lifeboat; they were rescued by a brig. The rest took to a dinghy, which was subsequently towed in to Watermouth, Devon. Zephyr was on a voyage from Cardiff, Glamorgan to Vlissingen, Zeeland, Netherlands. |

== 30 September ==
List of shipwrecks: 30 September 1889
| Ship | State | Description |
|---|---|---|
| Haabets Anker | Norway | The barque was abandoned off the Dogger Bank. Her crew were rescued by Zwallow (Norway). Haabet was on a voyage from Sunderland, County Durham, United Kingdom to Christiania. |
| Therese | Germany | The schooner foundered in the North Sea. Her crew were rescued. She was on a voyage from St Davids, Pembrokeshire, United Kingdom to Königsberg. |

== Unknown date ==
List of shipwrecks: Unknown date in September 1889
| Ship | State | Description |
|---|---|---|
| Albatros | Norway | The barque was abandoned at sea. Her crew were rescued. She was on a voyage from Greenock, Renfrewshire, United Kingdom to Buenos Aires, Argentina. |
| Alcedo | Spain | The steamship was wrecked in the Chausée du Sein. |
| Alpha | United States | The schooner was beached at Yakutat, District of Alaska. All fourteen people survived; they were rescued by the revenue cutter USRC Rush ( United States Revenue-Marine) on 5 September. |
| Alsylva | Norway | The barque was abandoned at sea. Her crew were rescued. She was on a voyage from Perth Amboy, New Jersey, United States to Copenhagen, Denmark. |
| Andromeda | Norway | The barque foundered at sea. Her crew were rescued by the steamship Frederik (Flag unknown). |
| Ann and Jane | United Kingdom | The schooner was driven ashore on or before 27 September. She was refloated and towed up the River Thames in a waterlogged condition on that date by the tug Australia (United Kingdom). |
| Avon | United Kingdom | The steamship ran aground at Garston, Lancashire. She was refloated on 21 September and taken in to Liverpool, Lancashire. |
| Aziolia | United Kingdom | The schooner was driven ashore at Lysekil, Sweden. She was refloated with assistance. |
| Baron Podesta | Italy | The barque was abandoned at sea. She was on a voyage from Pensacola, Florida, United States to Saint-Nazaire, Loire-Inférieure, France. |
| Bay of Naples | Flag unknown | The full-rigged ship caught fire at New York, United States and was beached. She was on a voyage from New York to Rangoon, Burma. She was severely damaged. She was refloated with the assistance of four tugs. |
| Blue Jacket | United Kingdom | The steamship was driven ashore at Kertch, Russia. She was later refloated. |
| Brandenberg | Flag unknown | The steamship caught fire at Lisbon, Portugal and was beached. The fire was extinguished. |
| Candidate | United Kingdom | The barque caught fire at Demerara, British Guiana. The fire was extinguished. |
| Canopus | United Kingdom | The steamship caught fire in the Saint Lawrence River. She was on a voyage from Montreal, Quebec, Canada to Liverpool. She put back to Quebec City. |
| Catarina R. | Italy | The ship was abandoned at sea before 14 September with the loss of six of her crew. |
| Ceylon | United Kingdom | The steam yacht ran aground off Smerge Point, near Trelleborg, Sweden. All on board were rescued by a steamship. She was later refloated and taken in to Copenhagen. |
| Conscript | United Kingdom | The steamship was driven ashore at Gooseberry Island, Newfoundland Colony. |
| Cymbeline | Flag unknown | The steamship was driven ashore at Luleå, Sweden. She was later refloated. |
| Dronning Sophie | Norway | The schooner was run down and sunk by the steamship Tijuca (Germany) 20 nautical miles (37 km) off Cabo da Roca, Portugal. All on board were rescued. Dronning Sophie was on a voyage from Magdalena to the English Channel. |
| Ethiopian | United Kingdom | The barque ran aground on the English Bank, in the River Plate. She was on a voyage from Sunderland, County Durham to Rosario, Argentina. She subsequently became a wreck. Her crew were rescued. |
| Fanny Bertha | United Kingdom | The steamship was on a sandbank in the White Sea off "Maszan", Russia with the loss of three of her crew. |
| Finstrom | Russia | The barque was driven ashore on Saltholmen, Denmark. |
| Finstrom | United Kingdom | The barque was driven ashore on Læsø, Denmark. She was on a voyage from Örnsköldsvik, Sweden to Caen, Calvados, France. |
| Firth of Solway | United Kingdom | The ship was driven ashore in Lough Foyle. She was later refloated and taken in to Londonderry. |
| Freya | Norway | The barque was abandoned at sea. Her crew were rescued. |
| Garibaldi | United Kingdom | The schooner foundered off Schouwen, Zeeland, Netherlands. Her crew survived. She was on a voyage from Pentewan, Cornwall to Dordrecht, South Holland, Netherlands. |
| Garland | Russia | The barque was towed in to Cuxhaven, Germany in a waterlogged condition. She was on a voyage from Neder Kalix, Sweden to Southampton, Hampshire, United Kingdom. |
| Geestemünde | United Kingdom | The full-rigged ship was driven ashore on the coast of New Jersey. She was on a voyage from Stettin to Philadelphia, Pennsylvania, United States. |
| Gefion | Norway | The schooner ran aground on the Lappegrunden, in the Baltic Sea. She was on a voyage from Berwick upon Tweed, Northumberland, United Kingdom to Danzig, Germany. She was refloated and towed in to Helsingør, Denmark. |
| Gironde | United Kingdom | The steamship was driven ashore on the Île de Sein, Finistère, France. She was abandoned by her crew. |
| Gitno | Austria-Hungary | The barque was abandoned at sea. |
| Glenholme | United Kingdom | The steamship ran aground at Höganäs, Sweden. She was on a voyage from Cardiff, Glamorgan to Stockholm, Sweden. She was refloated with the assistance of a number of steamships and taken in to Helsingør. |
| Godrevy | United Kingdom | The steamship was driven ashore at Cape Henry, Virginia, United States. She was on a voyage from St. Jago de Cuba, Cuba to Baltimore, Maryland, United States. |
| Harvest | United Kingdom | The steamship collided with the steamship Regent and sank at the mouth of the River Tees. |
| Heather Bell | United Kingdom | The schooner ran aground in Lough Foyle. |
| Hesleyside, and Karl Olof | United Kingdom; Flag unknown | The ships collided and were both severely damaged. Both vessels put in to Stockholm. |
| Hjasen | Norway | The brig was abandoned off the coast of Jutland. Her crew were rescued by the schooner Elizabeth (United Kingdom). Hjasen was on a voyage from Dram to London. |
| Hondo | United Kingdom | The steamship caught fire at New York. The fire was extinguished. |
| Ida | United States | The barque ran aground near Perth Amboy. |
| Il Salvatore | Italy | The barque was driven ashore at Philadelphia. |
| Ino | Sweden | The barque was damaged by fire at Rosario. She was on a voyage from Antwerp to Rosario. |
| Irongate | United Kingdom | The barque ran aground at Bahía Blanca, Brazil. She was on a voyage from Newport, Monmouthshire to Bahía Blanca. She was refloated and taken in to port. |
| J. Antonio Parez | Spain | The brigantine was abandoned in the Atlantic Ocean off the coast of Portugal. The ship's cat was taken off by the steamship Frey (Flag unknown) on 26 September. |
| Koranui | New Zealand | The steamship struck rocks and sank at Nelson. All on board were rescued. |
| Lombard | United Kingdom | The steamship ran aground in the Maas. She was later refloated. |
| Lucetta | Norway | The barque was wrecked on Vaygach Island, Russia. Her crew survived. |
| Joven A. Perez | Spain | The ship was abandoned in the Atlantic Ocean. She was on a voyage from Torrevieja to "Lucera". She was subsequently towed in to Figueira da Foz, Portugal. |
| Louisa | United Kingdom | The schooner was wrecked at Islandmagee, County Antrim. Her crew were rescued. She was on a voyage from Troon, Ayrshire to Larne, County Antrim. |
| Malangen | Norway | The brig was abandoned at sea. Her crew were rescued by the smack Exonian (United Kingdom) and the steamship Fredrik (Flag unknown). Malangen was on a voyage from a Baltic port to Leith, Lothian, United Kingdom. She was subsequently towed in to Lowestoft, Suffolk, United Kingdom by the smacks Confidence and Moggy (both United Kingdom). |
| Marion, and R. D. Armour | United States | The steamships collided in the St. Clair River. Marion was severely damaged. R. D. Armour sank. |
| Marlborough | United Kingdom | The steamship ran aground. She was refloated and taken in to Suez, Egypt. |
| Marne | France | The steamship ran aground at "Samailleraye", Seine-Inférieure. |
| Nellie M. Slade | United States | The barque was driven ashore. She was refloated and towed in to Hong Kong. |
| Nicanor | Flag unknown | The ship ran aground at Great Egg Harbour, New Jersey, United States. She was on a voyage from Montevideo, Uruguay to New York. |
| Octavia | France | The ship ran aground at Deauville, Manche and was severely damaged. She was later refloated. |
| Ottone | Italy | The barque caught fire at sea and was abandoned. Her crew were rescued by the brigantine Kaffir Chief (United Kingdom). Ottone was on a voyage from Grangemouth, Stirlingshire, United Kingdom to Buenos Aires. |
| Oxon | United Kingdom | The steamship ran aground at Storjungfrun, Gotland, Sweden. Her crew were rescued. She subsequently became a wreck. |
| President Harbitz | Norway | The ship was driven ashore and wrecked in the River Mersey. |
| Rabotnick | Russia | The steamship was driven ashore at Visby, Gotland. She was on a voyage from Ventspils, Courland Governorate to Kiel, Germany. |
| San Martin | Flag unknown | The steamship was driven ashore and wrecked on Flores Island, Azores. |
| Sara | Norway | The derelict barque was towed in to Geestemünde, Germany in a sinking conditiohn. |
| Snefrid | Norway | The barque was wrecked at Saint Thomas, Virgin Islands. Her crew were rescued. |
| Superior | Sweden | The barque was wrecked in the Baltic Sea. Her crew were rescued. |
| Union | United Kingdom | The schooner was driven ashore at Ballynass, County Londonderry. She was refloated on 16 September, but was driven ashore again. |
| Venetia | United Kingdom | The steamship caught fire at sea before 21 September. The fire was extinguished. |
| Vertumnus | United States | The steamship was driven ashore at New York. She was on a voyage from New York to Jamaica. |
| West | United Kingdom | The steamship ran aground on the Middelgrund, in the Baltic Sea. She was on a voyage from Barrow-in-Furness, Lancashire to Kronstadt, Russia. She was refloated and resumed her voyage. |
| West Stanley | United Kingdom | The steamship ran aground on the Middelgrund. She was on a voyage from Grangemouth to Rostock, Germany. She was refloated and resumed her voyage. |
| William Branfoot | United Kingdom | The steamship was driven ashore at Maasvlakte, South Holland. She was on a voyage from Pensacola to Rotterdam, South Holland. She was refloated with assistance. |
| Unnamed | Flag unknown | The steamship ran aground on the Banjaard Sand, in the North Sea off the coast of Zeeland. |
