= HMS Arab =

Seven vessels of the Royal Navy have been named HMS Arab:

- HMS Arab (1795) was a 16-gun sloop-of-war, originally the French corvette Jean Bart, captured in 1795 in the English Channel by HMS Cerberus and HMS Santa Margarita, and wrecked in 1796.
- HMS Arab (1797) was an 8-gun schooner, the former French Arabe, captured in 1797, renamed Ant in 1798, and sold in 1815.
- HMS Arab (1798) was a 22-gun post ship, originally the French flush-decked privateer Brave, captured in 1798 and fitted as a quarter-decked sloop in the same year. She was sold in 1810. She became a whaler, making seven voyages to the British southern whale fishery. Sank in 1824.
- HMS Arab (1812) was an 18-gun Cruizer-class brig-sloop launched in 1812 and wrecked in 1823 off Ireland.
- HMS Arab (1847) was a 16-gun Acorn-class brig-sloop launched in 1847. She was transferred as Coastguard watchvessel No. 18 in 1863 and was broken up in 1879.
- HMS Arab (1874) was an Arab-class gunvessel, launched in 1874 and sold in 1889.
- HMS Arab (1901) was a B-class destroyer launched in 1901 and sold in 1919.

== See also ==
- HMT Arab, a naval trawler commanded by Richard Stannard VC. He received the VC for his actions from 28 April to 2 May 1940 at Namsos, Norway, when HMT Arab survived 31 bombing attacks in five days.
- HMS Arabis
