= List of shipwrecks in January 1876 =

The list of shipwrecks in January 1876 includes ships sunk, foundered, grounded, or otherwise lost during January 1876.

== 1 January ==
List of shipwrecks: 1 January 1876
Ship	State	Description
Amanda	United Kingdom	The schooner was driven ashore and wrecked at Thisted, Denmark with the loss of five of her crew. She was on a voyage from Burntisland, Fife to Aarhus, Denmark.
Fanny	United Kingdom	The schooner was driven ashore at Sharpness, Gloucestershire. She was on a voyage from Gloucester to Plymouth, Devon.
Gem	United Kingdom	The Mersey Ferry collided with the tug King Fisher (United Kingdom) and was severely damaged. She was beached at Seacombe, Cheshire.
Helene Frederikke	Flag unknown	The schooner was driven ashore and wrecked west of Burntisland, Fife, United Kingdom.
Sophia	United Kingdom	The schooner was abandoned in the North Sea 6 nautical miles (11 km) south east of Dunstanburgh Castle, Northumberland. Her crew survived.

== 2 January ==
List of shipwrecks: 2 January 1876
Ship	State	Description
Abana, and Zambesi	United Kingdom	The steamship Abanda collided with the barque Zambesi off Scarborough, Yorkshire. Both vessels were severely damaged. Abana was on a voyage from the River Tyne to Dunkirk, Nord, France. She was towed back to the River Tye by the tug King Moor (United Kingdom).
Arabian	United Kingdom	The ship ran aground on the Cork Sand, in the North Sea off the coast of Essex. She was refloated the next day and resumed her voyage.
Kate Monaghan	New Zealand	The 102-ton schooner went ashore at the mouth of the Manawatu River owing to a sudden violent wind shift. All crew were saved, but most of the cargo was lost.
Volunteer	United Kingdom	The dandy collided with Young Jessie (United Kingdom) and sank in the North Sea 50 nautical miles (93 km) off Southwold, Suffolk. Her crew were rescued.

== 3 January ==
List of shipwrecks: 3 January 1876
Ship	State	Description
Champion of the Seas	United Kingdom	The extreme clipper was abandoned off Cape Horn, Chile. Her crew were rescued by the barque Windsor (United Kingdom).
Clifton	United Kingdom	The barque was driven ashore and wrecked at Rhosneigr, Anglesey. Her crew were rescued by the Rhosneigr Lifeboat.
Doctor Falke	United States	The ship was driven ashore at Rottingdean, Sussex, United Kingdom. She was on a voyage from New York to Bremen, Germany.
Ellen	United Kingdom	The schooner was wrecked on the Black Rock, in Dundrum Bay with the loss of her captain. She was on a voyage from New York to Bangor, County Down.
Frascati	Italy	The steamship struck a sunken wreck and sank in the English Channel off the French coast. Her fourteen crew were rescued by a French fishing smack. She was on a voyage from Cardiff, Glamorgan, United Kingdom to Les Sables-d'Olonne, Vendée, France.
Hay and Catherine	United Kingdom	The ship was driven ashore at Kingsdown, Kent. She was on a voyage from Aberdeen to Havre de Grâce, Seine-Inférieure, France. She was refloated and taken in to The Downs.
Lesmona	United States	The ship was driven ashore and wrecked at Cape Cod, Massachusetts.
Nellie Martin	United Kingdom	The steamship collided with the quayside at New York, United States and was severely damaged. She was on a voyage from Newcastle upon Tyne, Northumberland to New York.
Patagonia	United Kingdom	The barque was driven ashore and wrecked on Madeira, Her crew were rescued.
Richard and Auguste	Germany	The schooner was wrecked on Anholt, Denmark. Her crew were rescued. She was on a voyage from Hartlepool, County Durham, United Kingdom to Danzig.
Tycho Brahe	Belgium	The steamship ran aground in the Middle Gat. She was on a voyage from Antwerp to Buenos Aires, Argentina.
HMS Warspite	Royal Navy	The training ship was destroyed by fire at Charlton, Kent with the loss of three or four of the 458 people on board.

== 4 January ==
List of shipwrecks: 4 January 1876
Ship	State	Description
Favourite	United Kingdom	The Thames barge was run into by the steamship Nautilus (United Kingdom) and was beached at Blackwall, Middlesex.
Primrose	United Kingdom	The steamship ran aground on the Querpis Bank, in the Gironde. She was refloated and resumed her voyage.
Redstart	United Kingdom	The schooner ran aground on the Shoebury Sand, in the Thames Estuary. She was on a voyage from Boulogne, Pas-de-Calais, France to London. She was refloated and resumed her voyage.
San Rafael	United Kingdom	The full-rigged ship was destroyed by fire off the coast of Chile. Her 22 crew took to two boats; One boat with ten people on board reached New Years Island, Argentina, where they subsequently perished. Eleven survivors in the other boat were rescued on 31 January by Yorkshire (United Kingdom), one man having died at sea.
Typhena	United Kingdom	The brigantine was driven ashore at Barry Island, Glamorgan. She was refloated and beached at Cardiff, Glamorgan.

== 5 January ==
List of shipwrecks: 5 January 1876
Ship	State	Description
Bertha	Germany	The barque ran aground on the Lemon and Owers Sandbank, in the North Sea, and sank. Her crew got aboard the Lemon and Owers Lightship ( Trinity House), from where they were rescued by the steamship Minnie (United Kingdom). Bertha was on a voyage from Danzig to Newport, Monmouthshire, United Kingdom.
Bwllfa	United Kingdom	The steamship was driven ashore at East Greenwich, Kent. She was refloated.
Gustaf	United Kingdom	The steamship was driven ashore and wrecked at Cresswell, Northumberland, United Kingdom. All nineteen people on board were rescued by the Cresswell Lifeboat Old Potter ( Royal National Lifeboat Institution). Gustaf was on a voyage from Gothenburg to the River Tyne. She broke up on 13 January.
Mary Varwell	United Kingdom	The ship was wrecked on Barbuda. Her crew were rescued. She was on a voyage from London to St. Jago de Cuba, Cuba.
Perro	Austria-Hungary	The brig struck the Owers Sandbank, in the English Channel and sprang a leak. She was run ashore near Sandown, Isle of Wight, United Kingdom. She was on a voyage from South Shields, County Durham to Venice, Italy.
Speed	Norway	The brig ran aground on the Goodwin Sands, Kent. She was on a voyage from a Baltic port to Barrow in Furness, Lancashire, United Kingdom. She was refloated and taken in to The Downs.
Thorwald	United States	The barque was driven ashore at Bahía Honda, Cuba.
Victoria	United Kingdom	The tug was severely damaged by fire at Barcelona, Spain.

== 6 January ==
List of shipwrecks: 6 January 1876
Ship	State	Description
Brunswick	United Kingdom	The steamship ran aground on the Askew Spit, in Liverpool Bay. She was refloated and completed her voyage to Liverpool, Lancashire.
Emille	Italy	The barque collided with the steamship City of Brooklyn (United Kingdom) and sank 25 nautical miles (46 km) east of the Fastnet Rock. Three of her twelve crew were reported missing. The rest were rescued by City of Brooklyn.
Frascati	Flag unknown	The steamship foundered off the Île de Sein, Finistère, France. Her crew were rescued. She was on a voyage from Swansea, Glamorgan, United Kingdom to Les Sables-d'Olonne, Vendée, France.
Hooghly	France	The steamship was damaged by fire at La Joliette, Bouches-du-Rhône.
Isabella Wilson	United Kingdom	The ship was severely damaged by fire at Macduff, Aberdeenshire.
Semplice	United Kingdom	The ship ran aground in the River Laggan. She was on a voyage from Odesa, Russia to Belfast, County Antrim.
Speedwell	United Kingdom	The smack sprang a leak and foundered 2 nautical miles (3.7 km) off Great Orme Head, Caernarfonshire. Both crew survived. She was on a voyage from "Llanaglhairn" to Liverpool.
Svalen	Flag unknown	The ship was driven ashore at North Point. She was on a voyage from Baltimore, Maryland, United States to Londonerry, United Kingdom.
Tartar	United Kingdom	The brig ran aground on the Haisborough Sands, in the North Sea off the coast of Norfolk. She was on a voyage from Newcastle upon Tyne, Northumberland to London. She was refloated with the assistance of a tug and assisted in to Great Yarmouth, Norfolk.

== 7 January ==
List of shipwrecks: 7 January 1876
Ship	State	Description
Auguste Mathilde	Germany	The brig was driven ashore at Warnemünde. She was on a voyage from Plymouth, Devon, United Kingdom to Danzig. She was refloated with assistance and towed in to Rostock.
Furet, and Queen Emma	United Kingdom; France	The schooner Furet collided with the brig Queen Emma in the English Channel. Both vessels were severely damaged. Furet was on a voyage from Havre de Grâce, Seine-Inférieure to Neath, Glamorgan. She was towed in to Plymouth. Queen Emma lost a crew member. She was on a voyage from Huelva, Spain to Aberdeen.
Groningen	Netherlands	The steamship ran aground near Hoek van Holland, South Holland.
Ho Hoang	United Kingdom	The ship was driven ashore near Varberg, Sweden. Her crew were rescued. She was on a voyage from Memel, Germany to London. She was refloated with the assistance of a tug.
Hunter	Norway	The polacca-rigged barque ran aground on the Shipwash Sand, in the North Sea off the coast of Suffolk, United Kingdom. Her nine crew were rescued by the tug Liverpool (United Kingdom). Hunter was on a voyage from Christiania to Rochester, Kent, United Kingdom. She was refloated with assistance from the smack Jemima (United Kingdom) and the tug Liverpool.
Jylland	Denmark	The steamship ran aground near Maassluis, South Holland, Netherlands.
L. Mille	Italy	The barque was run into by the steamship City of Brooklyn (United Kingdom) and sank 35 nautical miles (65 km) off the Old Head of Kinsale, County Cork, United Kingdom with the loss of three of her crew. Survivors were rescued by City of Brooklyn. L. Mille was on a voyage from Marianople, Russia to Queenstown, County Cork.
Saphir	Norway	The schooner was wrecked at Eyemouth, Berwickshire, United Kingdom. Her six crew were rescued. She was on a voyage from Amsterdam, North Holland, Netherlands to Eyemouth.
Sidon	United Kingdom	The steamship put in to Malta on fire. She was on a voyage from Alexandria, Egypt to Liverpool, Lancashire. The fire was extinguished and she resumed her voyage.
Timandra	United Kingdom	The ship ran aground on the Holywood Bank, in the Belfast Lough. She was on a voyage from Belfast, County Antrim to Silloth, Cumberland.
Tjalfe	Denmark	The schooner was driven onto the Herd Sand, in the North Sea off the coast of County Durham, United Kingdom. Her crew were rescued by the South Shields Lifeboat Tom Perry ( Royal National Lifeboat Institution). Tjalfe was on a voyage from Laurvig, Norway to the River Tyne. She broke up the next day.
Valentine, and an unnamed vessel	United Kingdom; Flag unknown	The steamship Valentine ran down a brig in the English Channel. Valentine lost her captain. She was on a voyage from Bordeaux, Gironde, France to Swansea, Glamorgan. She was abandoned by her crew, but they later reboarded her and took her in to Penzance, Cornwall, in a leaky condition.

== 8 January ==
List of shipwrecks: 8 January 1876
Ship	State	Description
Albert	United Kingdom	The steamship ran around in the Nieuwe Waterweg. She was on a voyage from Hull, Yorkshire to Rotterdam, South Holland, Netherlands. She was refloated and completed her voyage.
Annie S. Hall	United Kingdom	The ship ran aground on the Tongue Sand, in the Thames Estuary. She was on a voyage from London to Algoa Bay. She was refloated and put in to Gravesend, Kent in a leaky condition.
Etatersand	(Russian Empire) Grand Duchy of Finland	The ship was driven ashore at Nidingen, Sweden. She was on a voyage from Helsinki to Leith, Lothian, United Kingdom. She was refloated and found to be leaky.
Frank	United Kingdom	The smack was wrecked at Waxholme, Yorkshire. Her ten crew were rescued by the Withernsea Lifeboat Pelican ( Royal National Lifeboat Institution).
Mary Helen	United Kingdom	The schooner was driven ashore at Gun Point. She was on a voyage from Liverpool, Lancashire to Padstow, Cornwall.
Unnamed	Flag unknown	The barque ran aground on the Maplin Sand, in the North Sea off the coast of Essex, United Kingdom.
Unnamed	Flag unknown	The barque ran aground on the Blacktail Sand, in the Thames Estuary.
Unnamed	Flag unknown	The brig ran aground on the Grain Spit, off the Isle of Grain, Kent.
Five unnamed vessels	Flags unknown	The steamships were driven ashore at Schulau, Germany.

== 9 January ==
List of shipwrecks: 9 January 1876
Ship	State	Description
Caroline Amalie	Sweden	The ship ran aground on the Flemish Banks, in the English Channel. She was refloated and found to be severely leaky.
German Empire	Germany	The steamship ran aground at Blankenese.
Manilla	Norway	The barque departed from Doboy, Georgia, United States for Bristol, Gloucestershire, United Kingdom. No further trace, presumed foundered with the loss of all hands.
Prince of Wales	United Kingdom	The steamship suffered a boiler explosion and sank in the River Medway with the loss of two of her crew.
Unnamed	Flag unknown	The ship collided with the steamship Paraense (United Kingdom) and foundered with the loss of all hands.

== 10 January ==
List of shipwrecks: 10 January 1876
Ship	State	Description
Clara	Belgium	The fishing smack collided with the fishing smack Lily of Devon (United Kingdom) and sank in the North Sea 30 nautical miles (56 km) off Lowestoft, Suffolk, United Kingdom with the loss of five of her six crew.
Claude Hamilton	United Kingdom	The steamship ran aground in the Nieuwe Waterweg. She was on a voyage from Rotterdam, South Holland, Netherlands to Harwich, Essex. She was refloated and resumed her voyage.
Gratitude	United Kingdom	The ship was driven ashore and wrecked 6 nautical miles (11 km) south of Seaham, county Durham.
Sainte-Anne	France	The fishing sloop capsized off Douarnenez, Finistère with the loss of nine of her ten crew.

== 11 January ==
List of shipwrecks: 11 January 1876
Ship	State	Description
Aberfoyle	United Kingdom	The ship departed from Iquique, Chile for the English Channel. No further trace, posted missing.
Alerte	Russia	The barque ran aground at Paraíba, Brazil. She was on avoyage from Paraíba to Liverpool, Lancashire, United Kingdom. She was refloated on 13 January and resumed her voyage.
Annie Edwin	(United Kingdom of Great Britain and Ireland) Jersey	The ship collided with Nordkap (Norway) and sank in the English Channel off Portland, Dorset. Her crew were rescued by Nordkap. Annie Edwin was on a voyage from Newport, Monmouthshire to Saint-Valery-sur-Somme, Somme, France.
Aurora	Germany	The ship was driven ashore by ice in the Drogden. She was on a voyage from Memel to an English port.
Emma and Robert	United Kingdom	The barque was driven ashore at Blankenese, Germany.
Hamburg	Germany	The steamship ran aground on the Luhesand.
Patriotess	United Kingdom	The barque was abandoned in the Atlantic Ocean. Her crew were rescued the next day by the barque Eleanor (United Kingdom). Patriotess was on a voyage from Jamaica to Liverpool.
Racer	United Kingdom	The ship ran aground on the Goodwin Sands, Kent. She was refloated and taken in to The Downs in a leaky condition.
Unnamed	United Kingdom	The Mersey Flat foundered off the Hilbre Islands, Cheshire, United Kingdom with the loss of all hands.
Unnamed	Flag unknown	The schooner ran aground on the West Hoyle Bank, in Liverpool Bay. She was refloated the next day.

== 12 January ==
List of shipwrecks: 12 January 1876
Ship	State	Description
Adventure	United Kingdom	The ship ran aground on the Jordan Flats, in Liverpool Bay and was damaged. She was on a voyage from Liverpool, Lancashire to Hull, Yorkshire. She was refloated and put back to Liverpool.
Dante	Flag unknown	The ship was wrecked near Mostaganem, Morocco. Her crew were rescuedf.
Hercules	Italy	The barque struck the Cabezos, in the Mediterranean Sea and sank. Her crew survived.
Josephine	United Kingdom	The ship was abandoned off Reggio Calabria, Italy. She came ashore at Messina, Sicily, Italy. She was refloated in late January and placed under repair.
Lady Aberdour	United Kingdom	The brig was driven ashore at Stephano Point, Ottoman Empire.
Mary Frost	United Kingdom	The ship caught fire at Galveston, Texas, United States and was scuttled. She was refloated.
Nanette	France	The ship was abandoned in the Mediterranean Sea off Dellys, Algeria. She was on a voyage from Cardiff, Glamorgan, United Kingdom to Algiers, Algeria.
Trio	United Kingdom	The brig struck a sunken wreck off Arklow, County Wicklow. She was on a voyage from Cardiff, Glamorgan to Dublin. She put in to Queenstown, County Cork in a leaky condition on 14 January.

== 13 January ==
List of shipwrecks: 13 January 1876
Ship	State	Description
Amor Fraterno	Austria-Hungary	The ship was damaged in a gale at Oran, Algeria.
Cambrian	United Kingdom	The ship was damaged in a gale at Oran.
Cora Linn	United Kingdom	The barque ran aground on the Old Warp Sand, in the Humber and capsized with the loss of four lives. She was on a voyage from Lyttelton, New Zealand to Goole, Yorkshire.
Europa	United Kingdom	The brigantine ran aground at West Cowes, Isle of Wight. She was on a voyage from Swansea, Glamorgan to West Cowes. She was refloated.
Friends	United Kingdom	The ship was driven ashore at Bawdsey, Suffolk. Her crew survived.
Geronima Antonia	Italy	The ship was damaged in a gale at Oran.
Globbo	Austria-Hungary	The ship was damaged in a gale at Oran.
Jeanne Joseph	United Kingdom	The ship ran aground on the Jordan Flats, in Liverpool Bay. She was refloated.
Leander	United Kingdom	The schooner ran aground at Padstow, Cornwall. She was on a voyage from Swansea, Glamorgan to Middlesbrough, Yorkshire. She was refloated and found to be leaky.
Oran	France	The steamship was damaged in a gale at Oran.
St. Olaf	Norway	The ship was damaged in a gale at Oran.
Tumoly	United Kingdom	The ship was damaged in a gale at Oran.
Vesper	United Kingdom	The steamship ran aground on the Kish Bank, in the Irish Sea off the coast of County Dublin and was wrecked. Her fifteen crew survived. She was on a voyage from Glasgow, Renfrewshire to Dunkirk, Nord, France.

== 14 January ==
List of shipwrecks: 14 January 1876
Ship	State	Description
Cydonia	United Kingdom	The brig ran aground on the West Hinder Sand, in the North Sea off the coast of Nord, France with the loss of one of her nine crew. Survivors were rescued by a fishing boat and a tug. She was on a voyage from South Shields, County Durham to Port-Louis, Mauritius.
Hematite	United Kingdom	The ship ran aground on Buggy Leap, off the north Devon coast and was abandoned by her crew. She floated off and was taken in to Ilfracombe, Devon.
Minister van Staat Bocchussen	Netherlands	The steamship ran aground in the Banos Strait south of the Seven Islands with the loss of five of her 41 crew. She was on a voyage from Singapore, Straits Settlements to Batavia, Netherlands East Indies. She was a total loss.
Neva	{{{flag}}}	The brig ran aground on the Maplin Sand, in the North Sea off the coast of Essex. She was refloated and assisted in to Harwich, Essex in a severely leaky condition
Unnamed	Italy	The barque was driven ashore and wrecked at Barcelona, Spain with the loss of all hands.
Unnamed	Flag unknown	The barque was driven ashore at Malgrat de Mar, Spain.
Unnamed	Italy	The barque was driven ashore 2 nautical miles (3.7 km) west of Barcelona with the loss of all hands.

== 15 January ==
List of shipwrecks: 15 January 1876
Ship	State	Description
Castor	Netherlands	The steamship collided with the steamship Lord Byron (United Kingdom) and ran aground at Maassluis, South Holland.
Eugene Mathilde	France	The brig was driven ashore at "Buen". She was on a voyage from Marseille, Bouches-du-Rhône to Nantes, Loire-Inférieure.
Marian	United Kingdom	The brig was wrecked at Saint Thomas, Virgin Islands.
Melaine	New Zealand	The 136-ton schooner stranded close to Kaipara Harbour's North Head, and became a total wreck.
Polam	United Kingdom	The steamship ran aground in the Dardanelles. She was on a voyage from Grimsby, Lincolnshire to Constantinople, Ottoman Empire. She was refloated with the assistance of a tug and resumed her voyage.

== 17 January ==
List of shipwrecks: 17 January 1876
Ship	State	Description
Argo	United Kingdom	The Thames barge was run into by the steamship Southwick(United Kingdom) or Malvina (Flag unknown) and was beached at Blackwall, Middlesex.
Becaière	France	The ship was wrecked on Saint Pierre Island.
Bertha Sonder	Canada	The ship was wrecked on Langlade Island. Her crew were rescued. She was on a voyage from Sydney, Nova Scotia to Saint-Pierre, Saint Pierre and Miquelon.
Bicaire	France	The ship was wrecked at Saint-Pierre.
Brother's Pride	Canada	The barque ran aground on Taylor's Bank, in Liverpool Bay. All eleven people on board were rescued by the New Brighton Lifeboat Willie and Arthur ( Royal National Lifeboat Institution). Brother's Pride was on a voyage from Saint John, New Brunswick to Liverpool, Lancashire. She floated off the next day and came ashore at Formby, Lancashire. She was refloated on 27 January and taken in to Liverpool.
Clara Louisa	Italy	The ship was driven ashore and wrecked on Formentera, Balearic Islands, Spain. She was on a voyage from Messina, Sicily to New York, United States.
Constance	United Kingdom	The steamship ran aground at Maassluis, South Holland, Netherlands. She was on a voyage from Cardiff, Glamorgan to Rotterdam, South Holland. She was refloated with the assistance of a number of tugs.
Maha Buleshwar	India	The ship ran aground in the Hooghly River. She was on a voyage from Calcutta to Dundee, Forfarshire, United Kingdom. She was refloated and put back to Calcutta in a leaky condition.
Maria D	Italy	The brigantine was driven ashore on Tavolara Island, Sardinia. Her crew were rescued.
Maria Giovanna	Italy	The barque was driven ashore at Lagos, Portugal. She was on a voyage from Hull, Yorkshire, United Kingdom to Cuba.
Rubens	United Kingdom	The steamship was driven ashore at Eastbourne, Sussex. She was on a voyage from Buenos Aires, Argentina to Antwerp, Belgium. She was refloated on 27 January and towed to Southampton, Hampshire for temporary repairs. She was subsequently towed to Liverpool for permanent repairs.
Ruchezahl	Austria-Hungary	The ship was severely damaged by ice at Kertch, Russia.
Salier	Germany	The steamship ran aground on the Brambles, in the Solent. She was on a voyage from New York to Bremen. She was refloated the next day and resumed her voyage.
Ventmeglia	Italy	The schooner was driven ashore on Tavolara Island. Her crew were rescued.
W. Ball	United Kingdom	The steamship ran aground on the Nash Sand, in the Bristol Channel.
Young Fanny	United Kingdom	The smack collided with the smack Mazeppa (United Kingdom) and sank in the North Sea 50 to 60 nautical miles (93 to 111 km) off the mouth of the Humber. Her crew were rescued by Mazeppa.

== 18 January ==
List of shipwrecks: 18 January 1876
Ship	State	Description
County of Argyle	United Kingdom	The ship ran aground on the Sovereign Shoal. She was on a voyage from Batavia, Netherlands East Indies to Rotterdam, South Holland, Netherlands. She was refloated with the assistance of a lugger and resumed her voyage.
Georgiana	United Kingdom	The barque departed from New Orleans, Louisiana, United States for Liverpool, Lancashire. No further trace, presumed foundered with the loss of all eighteen crew.
Huntsman	United Kingdom	The smack was driven ashore at Saltfleet, Lincolnshire. She was on a voyage from Blakeney, Norfolk to Hull, Yorkshire.
Marquis of Anglesey	United Kingdom	The ship ran aground at Bridgwater, Somerset.
Princess Royal	United Kingdom	The ship was driven ashore and sank at Trefusis, Cornwall.
Unnmed	Flag unknown	The schooner ran aground on the Maplin Sand, in the North Sea off the coast of Essex, United Kingdom.

== 19 January ==
List of shipwrecks: 19 January 1876
Ship	State	Description
Clio	France	The ship was driven ashore at Wilmington, Delaware. She was on a voyage from Bordeaux, Gironde to Wilmington.
Herald	United Kingdom	The schooner was driven ashore at Troon, Ayrshire. She was on a voyage from Drogheda, County Louth to Ayr.
Lady Bane	United Kingdom	The steamship ran aground at Carnlough County Antrim. She was on a voyage from Belfast to Carnlough.
Lake St. Clair	United Kingdom	The ship departed from New York for Glasgow, Renfrewshire. No further trace, presumed foundered with the loss of all hands.
Mignonette	United Kingdom	The ship was driven ashore near Brook, Isle of Wight. Her crew were rescued by the Brooke Lifeboat. She was on a voyage from Berbice, British Guiana to London.
Northumberland Maid	United Kingdom	The ship was driven ashore at Ayr. She was on a voyage from Newry, County Antrim to Ayr.
Rolling Wave	United Kingdom	The brig ran aground on the West Shoebury Sand, in the Thames Estuary. She was refloated.
Tweed	United Kingdom	The schooner ran aground on the Silloth Bank, in the Irish Sea off the coast of Cumberland. All six people on board were rescued by the Silloth Lifeboat. She was on a voyage from Falmouth, Cornwall to Silloth, Cumberland.

== 20 January ==
List of shipwrecks: 20 January 1876
Ship	State	Description
Alice	United Kingdom	The schooner sprang a leak and was beached near Algeciras, Spain. Her crew were rescued.
Alma	Norway	The brig was driven ashore on Skagen, Denmark with the loss of all ten crew.
Arento	United Kingdom	The ship was driven ashore in the River Thames. She was on a voyage from Rangoon, Burma to London.
Geneva	Italy	The steamship ran aground on the Whale Rock, off Point de Galle, Ceylon. She was on a voyage from Calcutta, India to Genoa.
Haabet	Denmark	The ship was driven ashore and wrecked on Skagen with some loss of life. She was on a voyage from Burntisland, Fife, United Kingdom to Rønne.
Louise	United Kingdom	The ship sprang a leak and was beached at East Blatchington, Sussex. She was on a voyage from London to Jersey, Channel Islands.
Marie	France	The brig was holed by an anchor and beached at Penarth, Glamorgan, United Kingdom. She capsized on 25 January and was a total loss.
Veritas	(United Kingdom of Great Britain and Ireland) Guernsey	The ship ran aground on the Maplin Sand, in the North Sea off the coast of Essex. She was on a voyage from Guernsey to London. She was refloated on 23 January and resumed her voyage.
Walton	United Kingdom	The barque departed from New York, United States for London. No further trace, presumed foundered with the loss of all hands.

== 21 January ==
List of shipwrecks: 21 January 1876
Ship	State	Description
Frederick Thompson	United Kingdom	The brig was driven ashore at Rye, Sussex. She was on a voyage from Boston to London.
Ida	United States	The ship broke from her moorings at Saint John's, Newfoundland Colony and was driven on to the Chain Rock.
Nestor	United Kingdom	The ship ran aground in the River Avon. She was on a voyage from Bristol, Gloucestershire to a port in Delaware, United States.
Reine du Ciel	France	The barque was wrecked on the Norwegian coast. Her crew were rescued. She was on a voyage from Onega, Russia to Nantes, Loire-Inférieure.
Tagus	United Kingdom	The steamship was run into by the steamship Severn (United Kingdom) and sank at Aspinwall, United States of Colombia. She had been refloated by 27 January.
Walter Thomas	United Kingdom	The schooner was driven ashore at Weybourne, Norfolk. She was on a voyage from Antwerp, Belgium to King's Lynn, Norfolk. She was refloated and assisted in to Blakeney, Norfolk in a leaky condition.
Wonderful	United Kingdom	The ship was driven ashore at Blakeney. She was refloated and taken in to Blakeney in a severely leaky condition.

== 22 January ==
List of shipwrecks: 22 January 1876
Ship	State	Description
Elizabeth	United Kingdom	The schooner sprang a leak and was beached at Ryde, Isle of Wight. She was on a voyage from Charlestown, Cornwall to Antwerp, Belgium.
Juan	United Kingdom	The brigantine ran aground on the Middle Sand, in the North Sea off the coast of Essex. She was refloated with assistance from the steamship Alarm (United Kingdom) but consequently sank off Sheerness, Kent. Her crew survived. Juan was on a voyage from Guernsey, Channel Islands to London. She was refloated on 26 January and taken in to Southend, Essex.
Victorine	United Kingdom	The ship was abandoned in the Atlantic Ocean. Her 38 crew took to two boats. Nineteen crew in one of the boats were rescued by 29 March by Nova Scotian (United Kingdom). Victorine was on a voyage from Pabellón de Pica, Chile to Nantes, Loire-Inférieure.

== 23 January ==
List of shipwrecks: 23 January 1876
Ship	State	Description
Ilala	United Kingdom	The steamship ran aground on the Swadman Rock, in the Farne Islands, Northumberland. She was on a voyage from Gainsborough, Lincolnshire to Gateshead, County Durham. Her crew were rescued from the rock the next day and the ship sank shortly afterwards.
Neda	United Kingdom	The barque was driven ashore and wrecked on an uninhabited island in the Shiant Islands, Outer Hebrides. All sixteen people survived. They were rescued from the island on 29 January.
New Alice	United Kingdom	The 52-foot (16 m), 26.8-ton fishing smack stranded at St. Bee's Beach. By 25 January she was a wreck.
Sophia Joachim	United Kingdom	The ship was driven ashore at Dungeness, Kent. Her crew survived.

== 24 January ==
List of shipwrecks: 24 January 1876
Ship	State	Description
Carondolet	United States	The steamboat sank in the Mississippi River 18 nautical miles (33 km) downstream of St Louis, Missouri.
Fred Christiansen	Norway	The ship ran aground at Larvik and was severely damaged. She was on a voyage from an English port to Larvik. She was refloated the next day.

== 25 January ==
List of shipwrecks: 25 January 1876
Ship	State	Description
Agnes	Western Australia	The schooner was driven ashore and severely damaged at Fremantle.
Blossom	Western Australia	The schooner was driven ashore and wrecked at Fremantle with the loss of all hands.
Commandant Franchotti	France	The steamship ran aground at Grimsby, Lincolnshire, United Kingdom. She was on a voyage from Bordeaux, Gironde to Grimsby. She was refloated.
Danzig	Germany	The steamship struck a sunken rock off "Oxoe", Denmark. She was on a voyage from Leith, Lothian, United Kingdom to Copenhagen, Denmark. She was refloated and resumed her voyage.
Lily of the Lake	Western Australia	The schooner was driven ashore and wrecked at Fremantle with the loss of all hands.
Marie	France	The brig ran aground, capsized and sank at Cardiff, Glamorgan, United Kingdom. She was on a voyage from Lorient, Morbihan to Cardiff. She was refloated on 9 February.
Progress	United Kingdom	The ketch collided with the brig Ethel (United Kingdom) and sank off Whitby, Yorkshire. Her crew were rescued.
Susanna	Western Australia	The schooner was driven ashore at Fremantle.
Wild Wave	Western Australia	The schooner was driven ashore and wrecked at Fremantle with the loss of all hands.

== 26 January ==
List of shipwrecks: 26 January 1876
Ship	State	Description
Abbie Thomas	United States	The ship was driven ashore. She was on a voyage from Philadelphia, Pennsylvania to a French port. She was refloated and put back to Philadelphia in a leaky condition.
Alice and Emma	United Kingdom	The schooner ran aground on the West Hoyle Bank, in Liverpool Bay. She was refloated.
Dorothy and Mary	United Kingdom	The schooner ran aground at Sconce Point, Hampshire. She was on a voyage from Caernarfon to Sunderland, County Durham. She was refloated.
Friends	United Kingdom	The ship ran aground on the Landscar Rocks. She was on a voyage from Middlesbrough to Whitby, Yorkshire. She was refloated and resumed her voyage in a leaky condition.
Gipsy Queen	United Kingdom	The steamship ran aground off "Wittenbergen".
Hempire (sic)	United States	The ship was destroyed by fire off the west coast of Africa, according to a message in a bottle that was swallowed by a cod and was discovered in November at Douglas, Isle of Man.
Louise Theresa	France	The brig was damaged by an onboard explosion off Penarth, Glamorgan, United Kingdom.
Mulgrave	United Kingdom	The ship ran aground on the Landscar Rocks. She was on a voyage from Middlesbrough to Whitby. She was refloated and resumed her voyage.
Prins Oscar	Norway	The ship was driven ashore at "Hoievarde". She was on a voyage from London, United Kingdom to Bergen.
Ranger	United Kingdom	The steamship sank off Crail, Fife.
Victor	United Kingdom	The brig was driven ashore at Speeton, Yorkshire. She was on a voyage from Hartlepool, County Durham to London. She was refloated and towed in to Hartlepool in a leaky condition by the paddle tug Great Emperor (United Kingdom).
Waterloo	United Kingdom	The schooner was run into by Julia (United Kingdom) and sank in the Belfast Lough. Her crew were rescued. Waterloo was on a voyage from Beaumaris, Anglesey to Greenock, Renfrewshire.

== 27 January ==
List of shipwrecks: 27 January 1876
Ship	State	Description
Annie	United Kingdom	The schooner was driven ashore and wrecked at East London, Cape Colony.
Cosmopolitan	United Kingdom	The steamship ran aground on the Pagensand, in the North Sea off the German coast. She was on a voyage from Hamburg, Germany to London. She was refloated and put back to Hamburg in a leaky condition.
Highlander	United Kingdom	The brand new tug was destroyed by fire at South Shields, County Durham.
Ilissus	France	The steamship arrived at Marseille, Bouches-du-Rhône on fire. The fire was extinguished.
Isle of Beauty	United Kingdom	The barque was driven ashore at Flamborough Head, Yorkshire. She was on a voyage from Lowestoft, Suffolk to Blyth, Northumberland. She was refloated the next day and resumed her voyage.
Ivanhoe	United Kingdom	The ship sprang a leak and was beached at Tobermory, Isle of Mull.
John Story Jr.	United States	The fishing schooner was run down and sunk off Eastern Point. Crew saved.
Mary	United Kingdom	The schooner was driven ashore at Seascale, Cumberland. Her crew were rescued.
Nicoline	Germany	The ship was driven ashore and wrecked at Port Elizabeth, Cape Colony.
Ocean	Norway	The barque was abandoned in the Atlantic Ocean. Her crew were rescued by the barque Daphne (France).
Rhine	United Kingdom	The Thames barge was run down and sunk in the River Thames by the paddle steamer Swallow. Her crew were rescued by Swallow.
Venedocian	United Kingdom	The ship was driven ashore 4 nautical miles (7.4 km) south of Filey, Yorkshire. She was refloated and resumed her voyage.

== 28 January ==
List of shipwrecks: 28 January 1876
Ship	State	Description
Alma	United Kingdom	The schooner ran aground at Wexford. She was refloated and towed in to Wexford.
David and Ann	United Kingdom	The fishing vessel was run down by the steamship Queen of Aberdeen (United Kingdom) and sank off Inchcape, Fife with the loss of one of her five crew.
Dinas	United Kingdom	The steamship ran aground on the West Oaze Sand, in the Thames Estuary. She was on a voyage from London to Cardiff, Glamorgan. She was refloated and resumed her voyage.
Elizabeth Moss	United Kingdom	The schooner was run into by the steamship Asiatic (United Kingdom) and sank at Madeira. Her crew were rescued.
Latona	United Kingdom	The steamship collided with the steamship Silistria (United Kingdom) and sank in the English Channel off Dover, Kent. Her crew were rescued by Silistria.
Mabel	United Kingdom	The steamship ran aground off Torcross, Devon. She was on a voyage from Antwerp, Belgium to Liverpool, Lancashire. She was refloated and resumed her voyage.
Maud Annie	United Kingdom	The schooner ran aground at Wexford. She was refloated and towed in to Wexford.
Meredith	United Kingdom	The steamship ran aground off Torcross. She was on a voyage from Hull, Yorkshire to a Welsh port. She was refloated the next day with the assistance of a tug and resumed her voyage.

== 29 January ==
List of shipwrecks: 29 January 1876
Ship	State	Description
City of Bangor	United Kingdom	The schooner was driven ashore on Gigha.
Hougoumont	Flag unknown	The ship was driven ashore at Queenstown, County Cork, United Kingdom. She was on a voyage from Queenstown to London, United Kingdom. She was refloated.
The Sprite	United Kingdom	The steamship caught fire at Cardiff, Glamorgan and was scuttled.

== 30 January ==
List of shipwrecks: 30 January 1876
Ship	State	Description
Dalecarlia	United Kingdom	The ship departed from Calcutta, India for London. No further trace, presumed foundered with the loss of all hands.

== 31 January ==
List of shipwrecks: 31 January 1876
Ship	State	Description
Atalaya	Italy	The ship was driven ashore at West Chop, Massachusetts, United States. She was on a voyage from Palermo, Sicily to Boston, Massachusetts. She was refloated.
Elise Prospero	France	The brigantine was abandoned in the Atlantic Ocean. Her seven crew took to a boat; four survivors were rescued a week later by the steamship Vanguard (United Kingdom). Elise Prosper was on a voyage from Pensacola, Florida, United States to Brest, Finistère.
Madeline	United Kingdom	The steamship ran aground on the Longsand, in the North Sea off the coast of Essex. She was on a voyage from Hartlepool, County Durham to the East Indies. She was refloated the next day.
Maggie	Canada	The ship was driven ashore at "Touris". She was consequently condemned.
Mariana	United Kingdom	The ship was driven ashore at "Point Brena". She was on a voyage from Liverpool, Lancashire to Maracaibo, Venezuela. She was a total loss.

== Unknown date ==
List of shipwrecks: Unknown date in January 1876
Ship	State	Description
Adieu	Norway	The ship was wrecked at Saint Domingo before 25 January.
Alexandra	France	The dandy rigged sloop was abandoned in the Atlantic Ocean before 15 January.
Anna Pauwlona	Netherlands	The ship ran aground at Maassluis, South Holland.
HMS Arab	Royal Navy	The Arab-class gunvessel ran aground on a reef off Zanzibar and was severely damaged. She was refloated and temporary repairs were made. She departed for Bombay, India for permanent repairs on 11 January.
Cacique	Spain	The steamship was driven ashore at Punta Araya, Venezuela before 11 January. She was refloated.
Enterprise II	Netherlands	The ship was wrecked on the Colorados before 8 January. She was on a voyage from New Orleans, Louisiana, United States to Havre de Grâce, Seine-Inférieure.
Fowler	United Kingdom	The schooner was driven ashore and wrecked at Sandsend, Yorkshire. Her crew were rescued.
Genova	Italy	The steamship ran aground on the Whale Rock, off Point de Galle, Ceylon before 20 January. She was on a voyage from Calcutta, India to Genoa. She subsequently became a wreck.
Hedrun	United States	The ship was wrecked on the Anegada Reef, in the Bahamas. She was on a voyage from Chester, Pennsylvania to Minatitlán, Mexico.
Jessie Goodwin	United Kingdom	The barque was damaged by fire at Galveston, Texas, United States.
Johann Carl	Germany	The ship was wrecked at Saint Domingo before 25 January.
John D. Tupper	United Kingdom	The brig was wrecked on the coast of Brazil. She was on a voyage from London to East London, Cape Colony.
Fair Queen	Western Australia	The schooner was driven ashore at the North West Cape before 25 January.
Kaffir Chief	United Kingdom	The ship was wrecked in the Natal Colony. All on board were rescued. She was on a voyage from London to the Natal Colony.
Laura	United Kingdom	The brig was driven ashore at Malahide, County Dublin. She was on a voyage from the Bull River to Dublin. She was refloated on 29 January and taken in to Dublin.
Le Bon Père	France	The brigantine was driven ashore at Ardrossan, Ayrshire, United Kingdom. She was on a voyage from Belfast, County Antrim to Ardrossan. She was refloated on 10 January and taken in to Ardrossan.
Luna Nueva	Spain	The barque ran aground off Cárdeas, Cuba in early January. She was on a voyage from Liverpool, Lancashire, United Kingdom to Cárdenas. She was refloated and taken in to Cárdenas.
Moonshine	United Kingdom	The smack sank in the Thames Estuary between the Mouse Sand and the Nore. Her crew were rescued.
Nicholine	Germany	The schooner was wrecked in Algoa Bay.
Ocean Queen	United Kingdom	The ship was driven ashore at Redding Point, Devon. She had been refloated by 20 January.
Osaka	Japan	The steamship collided with the steamship Oregonian (United States) and sank in the Inland Sea of Japan before 5 January.
Rallus	United Kingdom	The steamship collided with the steamship State of Nevada and sank at Antwerp, Belgium.
Sarah Nicholson	United Kingdom	The ship ran aground on a reef in the Halmahera Sea before 5 January. She was on a voyage from Cardiff, Glamorgan to Hong Kong. She was refloated and completed her voyage.
Susan	United Kingdom	The smack sank at Sheen, County Kerry. Her crew were rescued.
Trident	Austria-Hungary	The barque was wrecked on the coast of Gaza, Egypt with the loss of three of her crew.
Vandyke	France	The ship was wrecked at Saint Domingo before 25 January.
Victor	Norway	The ship ran aground at Wilmington, Delaware, United States. She was on a voyage from Wilmington to Rotterdam, South Holland.
Waterhen	United Kingdom	The barque was wrecked. Her crew were rescued.
