= HMS Lily =

Nine ships of the Royal Navy have been named HMS Lily or HMS Lilly: (Note: "Lilly" was used as a largely interchangeable spelling variant)

- English ship Lily (1642), of 12 guns and 110 tons, purchased in 1642 and under the command of Captain Isaias Blowfield when she was wrecked in September 1653 when she was driven ashore in a storm.
- English ship Lily (1657), a 6-gun ketch launched in 1657 and sold in 1667.
- English ship Lily (1672), a 6-gun sloop launched in 1672 and under the command of Captain William Sherwin when she foundered in 1674.
- HMS Lily, a 16-gun brig-sloop. She was formerly the brig Sir Charles Grey, purchased in 1795 and named HMS Spencer. She was renamed Lily (or Lilly) in 1800, captured by the French privateer Dame Ambert in 1804, and renamed Général Ernouf. She exploded and was lost in 1805 during an engagement with HMS Renard.
- HMS Lilly, a brig, the former British East India Company packet ship Swallow, launched in 1779, purchased in 1804, and sold in 1811.
- HMS Lily (1837), a 16-gun Racer-class brig launched in 1837, converted to coal hulk C29 in 1860, renamed C15 and sold in 1908.
- HMS Lily (1861), a 4-gun Cormorant-class gunvessel launched in 1861 and broken up in 1867.
- HMS Lily (1874), a 3-gun Arab-class gunvessel launched in 1874 and wrecked off Labrador in 1889.
- HMS Lily (1915), an Acacia-class sloop launched in 1915, converted to a depot ship in 1923, renamed Vulcan II. She was renamed Adamant II in 1930 and sold the same year.
