= Arabis (disambiguation) =

Arabis may refer to:

- Arabis, a flowering plant genus
- Arabis-class sloop, the third class of minesweeping sloops of the Royal Navy in World War I
- HMNZS Arabis, a Royal New Zealand Navy corvette
- HMS Arabis, various ships of the Royal Navy
- 1087 Arabis, a minor planet
- Arabis or Arabius, ancient name for the Hub River
