= TSS Anglesey =

Steam Cargo Vessel

History
- Name: 1888–1911: TSS Anglesey
- Owner: 1888–1911: London and North Western Railway
- Operator: 1888–1911: London and North Western Railway
- Port of registry: (United Kingdom)
- Route: 1888–1911: Holyhead – Dublin
- Builder: Harland & Wolff
- Yard number: 203
- Launched: 20 August 1887
- Completed: 1 May 1888
- Fate: Scrapped 1910

General characteristics
- Tonnage: 887 GRT
- Length: 300 ft (91 m)
- Beam: 33.1 ft (10.1 m)
- Draught: 13.4 ft (4.1 m)

TSS Anglesey was a steam turbine cargo vessel operated by the London and North Western Railway from 1888 to 1910.

== History ==
She was built by Harland & Wolff for the London and North Western Railway in 1888 and put on the Holyhead – Dublin route. She was one of a trio of ships built over four years for this route, all of a similar size. The other ships were Olga and Irene. On 25 November 1888, a fire broke out whilst she was on a voyage from Dublin to Holyhead. Cargo to the value of £2,000 was destroyed.

She was disposed of in 1910.
