= TSS Olga =

Steam turbine cargo vessel

History
- Name: 1887–1908: TSS Olga
- Owner: 1887–1908: London and North Western Railway
- Operator: 1887–1908: London and North Western Railway
- Port of registry: (United Kingdom)
- Route: 1887–1908: Holyhead – Dublin
- Builder: Cammell Laird
- Yard number: 557
- Launched: 3 August 1887
- Out of service: March 1908
- Fate: Scrapped 1908

General characteristics
- Tonnage: 970 gross register tons (GRT)
- Length: 301.5 ft (91.9 m)
- Beam: 33 ft (10 m)
- Draught: 13.6 ft (4.1 m)

TSS Olga was a steam turbine cargo vessel operated by the London and North Western Railway from 1887 to 1908.

== History ==
She was built by Cammell Laird for the London and North Western Railway in 1888 and put on the Holyhead – Dublin route. She was one of a trio of ships built over 4 years for this route, all of a similar size. The other ships were the Irene and Anglesey.

Olga was the first L&NWR ship to be fitted with triple engines.

She was disposed of in 1908.
