= PS Banshee =

History

United Kingdom
- Name: Banshee
- Owner: London and North Western Railway
- Operator: London and North Western Railway
- Port of registry: Dublin
- Route: Holyhead – Dublin
- Builder: Laird Brothers, Birkenhead
- Yard number: 521
- Launched: 30 January 1884
- Completed: June 1884
- Out of service: 1906
- Identification: UK official number 88991
- Fate: Scrapped October 1906

General characteristics
- Tonnage: 1,250 GRT, 246 NRT
- Length: 310.2 ft (94.5 m)
- Beam: 34.1 ft (10.4 m)
- Depth: 14.3 ft (4.4 m)
- Propulsion: oscillating steam engine
- Speed: as built: 19 knots (35 km/h); 1894: 21 knots (39 km/h)

PS Banshee was a passenger paddle steamer owned and operated by the London and North Western Railway from 1884 to 1906.

== History ==
Laird Brothers built her in Birkenhead for the London and North Western Railway (LNWR). She was launched on 30 January 1884, and completed that June. The LNWR's railway locomotive works at Crewe made her boilers. She had electric lighting.

On 12 September 1889, Banshee collided with Irene 30 nautical miles (56 km) off Holyhead, Anglesey whilst on a voyage from Holyhead to Dublin. Both vessels were severely damaged. Banshee was assisted in to Holyhead by Irene. In 1894 she was fitted with new engines, which increased her speed from 19 knots (35 km/h) to 21 knots (39 km/h).

In 1906 the LNWR sold her to JJ King, who resold her to Italian buyers in Genoa. She was scrapped that October.
