= TSS Irene =

History
- Name: 1885–1906: TSS Irene
- Owner: 1885–1906: London and North Western Railway
- Operator: 1885–1906: London and North Western Railway
- Port of registry: (United Kingdom)
- Route: 1885–1906: Holyhead – Dublin
- Builder: Harland & Wolff
- Yard number: 181
- Launched: 10 July 1885
- Completed: 29 September 1885
- Out of service: 1906
- Fate: Scrapped 1906

General characteristics
- Tonnage: 897 GRT
- Length: 301.2 ft (91.8 m)
- Beam: 33.2 ft (10.1 m)
- Draught: 13.5 ft (4.1 m)

TSS Irene was a steam turbine cargo vessel operated by the London and North Western Railway from 1885 to 1906.

== History ==
She was built by Harland & Wolff for the London and North Western Railway in 1885 and put on the Holyhead – Dublin route. She was one of a trio of ships built over 4 years for this route, all of a similar size. The other ships were the Olga and Anglesey.

On 12 September 1889, Irene collided with Banshee 30 nautical miles (56 km) off Holyhead whilst of a voyage from Holyhead to Dublin. Both vessels were severely damaged. Irene assisted Banshee in to Holyhead. She was disposed of in 1906.
