= 1087 Arabis =

Main-belt asteroid

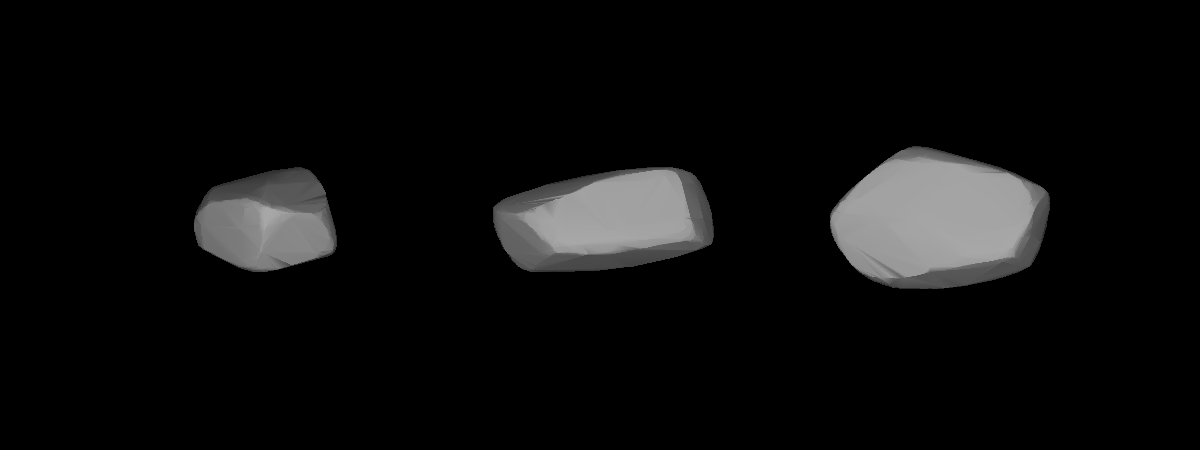
- Lightcurve-based 3D-model of Arabis

Discovery
- Discovered by: K. Reinmuth
- Discovery site: Heidelberg Obs.
- Discovery date: 2 September 1927

Designations
- Pronunciation: /ˈærəbɪs/
- Named after: Arabis (flowering plant)
- Alternative designations: 1927 RD · 1973 LB; A917 UE
- Minor planet category: main-belt · (outer); Eos

Orbital characteristics
- Epoch 4 September 2017 (JD 2458000.5)
- Uncertainty parameter 0
- Observation arc: 89.40 yr (32,655 days)
- Aphelion: 3.2984 AU
- Perihelion: 2.7300 AU
- Semi-major axis: 3.0142 AU
- Eccentricity: 0.0943
- Orbital period (sidereal): 5.23 yr (1,911 days)
- Mean anomaly: 12.959°
- Mean motion: 0° 11^{m} 17.88^{s} / day
- Inclination: 10.061°
- Longitude of ascending node: 30.425°
- Argument of perihelion: 25.793°

Physical characteristics
- Dimensions: 31.67 km (derived); 31.75±2.5 km 36.97±0.50 km 37.498±0.493 km 45.625±0.588 km 47.98±0.80 km
- Synodic rotation period: 5.794 h 5.794995±0.000002 h (Note: Hanus (2016d) publication not indexed in ADS. Summary figures for (1087) Arabis at LCDB); 5.79500±0.00001 h (Note: Hanus (2017c) not yet indexed in ADS. Summary figures for (1087) Arabis at LCDB); 5.79501±0.00005 h 5.797±0.001 h
- Geometric albedo: 0.098±0.015; 0.1031±0.0150; 0.171±0.006; 0.2137 (derived); 0.2248±0.040
- Spectral type: Tholen = S B–V = 0.823; U–B = 0.370
- Absolute magnitude (H): 9.73 · 9.75±0.26 · 9.79

1087 Arabis /ˈærəbɪs/ is a stony Eoan asteroid from the outer regions of the asteroid belt, approximately 35 kilometers in diameter. It was discovered by Karl Reinmuth at the Heidelberg Observatory in 1927 and assigned the provisional designation 1927 RD. The asteroid was named after the flowering plant Arabis (rockcress).

== Discovery ==
Arabis was officially discovered on 2 September 1927, by German astronomer Karl Reinmuth at the Heidelberg-Königstuhl State Observatory in southwest Germany. On the same night, it was independently discovered by Soviet-Russian astronomers Sergey Belyavsky and Nikolaj Ivanov at the Simeiz Observatory on the Crimean peninsula. The Minor Planet Center does not acknowledge these independent discoverers.

The asteroid was first identified as A917 UE at the Simeiz Observatory in October 1917, almost 10 years prior to its official discovery observation at Heidelberg.

== Orbit and classification ==
Arabis is a member the Eos family (606), the largest asteroid family in the outer main belt consisting of nearly 10,000 known asteroids. It orbits the Sun at a distance of 2.7–3.3 AU once every 5 years and 3 months (1,911 days). Its orbit has an eccentricity of 0.09 and an inclination of 10° with respect to the ecliptic. The body's observation arc begins with its official discovery observation at Heidelberg.

== Physical characteristics ==
In the Tholen classification, Arabis is a common S-type asteroid.

=== Rotation period ===
During the early 1990s, a rotational lightcurve was obtained in a photometric survey of small asteroids by European astronomers at the Chilean La Silla Observatory using the ESO 1-metre telescope. In November 2006, another lightcurve of Arabis was obtained by astronomers at the Oakley Observatory in Indiana, United States. Lightcurve analysis gave two well-defined rotation periods of 5.794 and 5.797 hours with a brightness variation of 0.14 and 0.40 magnitude, respectively (U=3/3).

=== Spin axis ===
Between 2011 and 2017, an international collaboration modeled three lightcurves with a period of 5.794995, 5.79500 and 5.79501 hours, respectively. The more recent studies also determined two spin axis of (155.0°, 25.0°) and (331.0°, 5.0°) in ecliptic coordinates (λ, β).

=== Diameter and albedo ===
According to the surveys carried out by the Infrared Astronomical Satellite IRAS, the Japanese Akari satellite and the NEOWISE mission of NASA's Wide-field Infrared Survey Explorer, Arabis measures between 31.75 and 47.98 kilometers in diameter and its surface has an albedo between 0.098 and 0.2248.

The Collaborative Asteroid Lightcurve Link derives an albedo of 0.2137 and a diameter of 31.67 kilometers based on an absolute magnitude of 9.79.

== Naming ==
This minor planet was named after the flowering plant Arabis (rockcress), a genus of herbs of the brassicaceae (known as the mustards, the crucifers, or the cabbage family). The official naming citation was mentioned in The Names of the Minor Planets by Paul Herget in 1955 (H 102).

=== Reinmuth's flowers ===
Due to his many discoveries, Karl Reinmuth submitted a large list of 66 newly named asteroids in the early 1930s. The list covered his discoveries with numbers between (1009) and (1200). This list also contained a sequence of 28 asteroids, starting with 1054 Forsytia, that were all named after plants, in particular flowering plants (also see list of minor planets named after animals and plants).
