= HMS Arabis =

Three ships of the Royal Navy have borne the name HMS Arabis, after the flower, the Arabis.

- HMS Arabis (1915) was an Arabis-class sloop launched in 1915 and sunk in 1916.
- HMS Arabis (K73) was a Flower-class corvette launched in 1940. She was transferred to the US Navy in 1942 as USS Saucy. She was returned in 1945, renamed HMS Snapdragon, and was sold in 1946.
- HMS Arabis (K385) was another Flower-class corvette, launched in 1943 and on completion lent to the Royal New Zealand Navy where she served as HMNZS Arabis. The ship was returned to the Royal Navy in 1948 and scrapped in 1951.

== See also ==
- Arabis-class sloop, Royal Navy minesweeper class
- Arabis (disambiguation)
