= HMS Arab (1874) =

Arab-class composite gunboat

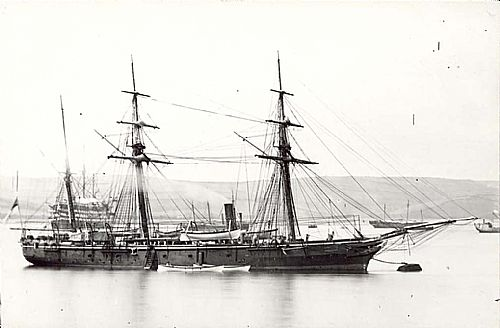
- An Arab-class gunvessel

History

United Kingdom
- Name: HMS Arab
- Ordered: 1873
- Builder: Robert Napier and Sons, Govan, Glasgow
- Cost: £35,023
- Yard number: 333
- Laid down: 1873
- Launched: 13 October 1874
- Commissioned: July 1875
- Decommissioned: 1885
- Fate: Sold for scrap, 1889

General characteristics (as built)
- Class & type: Arab-class composite gunvessel
- Displacement: 720 long tons (730 t)
- Length: 167 ft 0 in (50.9 m) (oa); 150 ft 2 in (45.8 m) (p/p)
- Beam: 28 ft 6 in (8.7 m)
- Draught: 13 ft 6 in (4.1 m)
- Depth of hold: 17 ft 6 in (5.3 m)
- Installed power: 656 ihp (489 kW); 3 × boilers
- Propulsion: 1 × 2-cylinder horizontal compound-expansion steam engine; 1 hoisting screw
- Sail plan: Barque rig
- Speed: 10 knots (19 km/h; 12 mph)
- Range: 790 nmi (1,460 km; 910 mi) at 10 knots (19 km/h; 12 mph)
- Complement: 90
- Armament: 1 × 7-inch rifled muzzle-loading gun; 2 × 6.3-inch 64-pounder rifled muzzle-loading guns; 2 × machine guns; 1 × light gun; From 1879: 1 × 7-inch rifled muzzle-loading gun; 1 × 6.3-inch 64-pounder rifled muzzle-loading guns forward; 3 × 20-pounder breech-loading guns aft; 2 × machine guns; 1 × light gun

HMS Arab was an Arab-class composite gunvessel built for the Royal Navy in 1874. She served in the East Indies and was sold in 1889.

== Design and construction ==
Designed by Nathaniel Barnaby, the Royal Navy's Chief Constructor, Arab was ordered from the Govan yard of Robert Napier and Sons in 1873 and laid down the same year as yard number 333. She was launched on 13 October 1874 and commissioned at Devonport in August 1875.

Her hull was built of iron frames and ribs, and planked in wood. This "composite" construction was both cheap and easy to repair and allowed the wooden planking to be coppered, reducing marine growth. On far-flung colonial stations, the benefits of both simple repair and reduced marine growth were particularly positive, due to a lack of substantial ship repair and careening facilities. For this reason, smaller vessels like the Arab class continued to use composite construction until long after larger vessels had transitioned to iron or steel construction.

=== Propulsion ===
Steam was provided at 60 pounds per square inch (410 kPa) by 3 boilers to a single 2-cylinder horizontal compound-expansion steam engine generating 656 indicated horsepower (489 kW). A single screw was provided, which could be hoisted clear of the water to improve the ship's hull lines when sailing. She achieved a trials speed of 10.3 knots (19.1 km/h; 11.9 mph) under power. A sailing rig was provided, with square rig on the fore and main masts, and fore-and-aft rigging only on the mizzen, giving her a "barque" rig.

=== Armament ===
A single 7-inch rifled muzzle-loading gun amidships and two 6.3-inch 64-pounder rifled muzzle-loading guns, one forward and one aft, and both fitted on traversing slides, constituted her main armament. Two machine guns and a light gun were also fitted. Arab (but not her sister ship, Lily) was re-armed in about 1879, with the after 6.3-inch 64-pounder gun replaced by three 20-pounder breech-loading guns under a newly constructed poop deck.

== Service ==
Arab served on the East Indies station. In January 1876, she ran aground on a reef off Zanzibar and was severely damaged. She was refloated and temporary repairs were made. She sailed for Bombay, India on 11 January for permanent repairs. Arab was ordered to return home in 1879, receiving a revised armament at about that time.

== Fate ==
Arab was sold in 1889.

== Bibliography ==
- Ballard, G. A. (1942). "British Gunvessels of 1875: The Smaller Single-Screw Type". Mariner's Mirror. 28 (October). Cambridge, UK: Society for Nautical Research: 308–13. doi:10.1080/00253359.1942.10658817.
- Chesneau, Roger; Kolesnik, Eugene M., eds. (1979). Conway's All the World's Fighting Ships 1860–1905. Greenwich, UK: Conway Maritime Press. ISBN 0-8317-0302-4.
- Conway's All the World's Fighting Ships 1860-1905. Conway Maritime Press. 1979. p. 110. ISBN 978-0-85177-133-5.
- Lyon, David & Winfield, Rif (2004). The Sail and Steam Navy List: All the Ships of the Royal Navy 1815–1889. Chatham Publishing. ISBN 978-1-86176-032-6. OCLC 52620555.
