= HMS Lily (1874) =

Arab-class composite gunboat

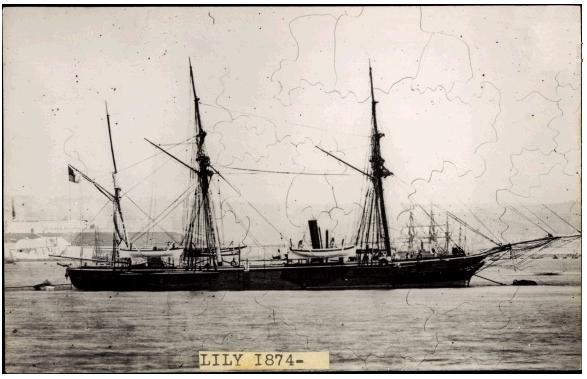
- A postcard of HMS Lily

History

United Kingdom
- Name: HMS Lily
- Ordered: 1873
- Builder: Robert Napier and Sons, Govan, Glasgow
- Cost: £34,108
- Yard number: 334
- Laid down: 1873
- Launched: 27 October 1874
- Commissioned: August 1875
- Decommissioned: 1885
- Fate: Wrecked, 16 September 1889

General characteristics (as built)
- Class & type: Arab-class composite gunvessel
- Displacement: 720 long tons (730 t)
- Length: 167 ft 0 in (50.9 m) (oa); 150 ft 2 in (45.8 m) (p/p)
- Beam: 28 ft 6 in (8.7 m)
- Draught: 13 ft 6 in (4.1 m)
- Depth of hold: 17 ft 6 in (5.3 m)
- Installed power: 829 ihp (618 kW); 3 × boilers
- Propulsion: 1 × 2-cylinder horizontal compound-expansion steam engine; 1 hoisting screw
- Sail plan: Barque rig
- Speed: 10 knots (19 km/h; 12 mph)
- Range: 790 nmi (1,460 km; 910 mi) at 10 knots (19 km/h; 12 mph)
- Complement: 90
- Armament: 1 × 7-inch rifled muzzle-loading gun; 2 × 6.3-inch 64-pounder rifled muzzle-loading guns; 2 × machine guns; 1 × light gun

HMS Lily was an Arab-class composite gunvessel built for the Royal Navy. She was launched in 1874, saw service in Chinese and North American waters, and was wrecked on the coast of Labrador on 16 September 1889.

== Design and construction ==
Designed by Nathaniel Barnaby, the Royal Navy's Chief Constructor, Lily was ordered from the Govan yard of Robert Napier and Sons in 1873 and laid down the same year as yard number 334. She was launched on 27 October 1874 and commissioned at Devonport in August 1875.

Her hull was built of iron frames and ribs, and planked in wood. This "composite" construction was both cheap and easy to repair and allowed the wooden planking to be coppered, reducing marine growth. On far-flung colonial stations, the benefits of both simple repair and reduced marine growth were particularly positive, due to a lack of substantial ship repair and careening facilities. For this reason, smaller vessels like the Arab class continued to use composite construction until long after larger vessels had transitioned to iron or steel construction.

=== Propulsion ===
Steam was provided at 60 pounds per square inch (410 kPa) by 3 boilers to a single 2-cylinder horizontal compound-expansion steam engine generating 829 indicated horsepower (618 kW). A single screw was provided, which could be hoisted clear of the water to improve the ship's hull lines when sailing. She achieved a trials speed of 10.7 knots (19.8 km/h; 12.3 mph) under power. A sailing rig was provided, with square rig on the fore and main masts, and fore-and-aft rigging only on the mizzen, giving her a "barque" rig.

=== Armament ===
A single 7-inch rifled muzzle-loading gun amidships and 2 6.3-inch 64-pounder rifled muzzle-loading guns, one forward and one aft, and both fitted on traversing slides, constituted her main armament. Two machine guns and a light gun were also fitted.

== Service ==
Lily served on the China station and was recommissioned at Hong Kong in 1879. By April 1886 she was serving on the North America and West Indies station.

== Fate ==
Lily was wrecked off Point Amour Lighthouse, Labrador in thick fog on 16 September 1889. A capsized boat caused the death of seven of her ship's company.

== Bibliography ==
- Ballard, G. A. (1942). "British Gunvessels of 1875: The Smaller Single-Screw Type". Mariner's Mirror. 28 (October). Cambridge, UK: Society for Nautical Research: 308–13. doi:10.1080/00253359.1942.10658817.
- Chesneau, Roger; Kolesnik, Eugene M., eds. (1979). Conway's All the World's Fighting Ships 1860-1905. Greenwich, UK: Conway Maritime Press. ISBN 0-8317-0302-4.
- Conway's All the World's Fighting Ships 1860-1905. Conway Maritime Press. 1979. p. 110. ISBN 978-0-85177-133-5.
- Lyon, David & Winfield, Rif (2004). The Sail and Steam Navy List: All the Ships of the Royal Navy 1815–1889. Chatham Publishing. ISBN 978-1-86176-032-6. OCLC 52620555.
