= Arab-class gunvessel =

Royal Navy gunboat class

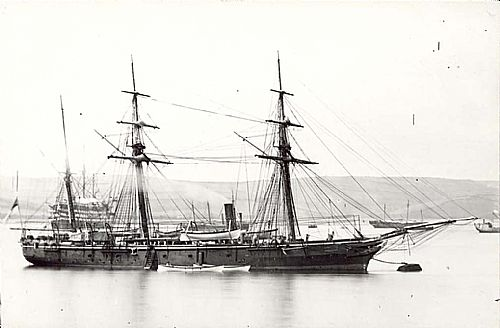
- An Arab-class gunvessel

Class overview
- Name: Arab class
- Operators: Royal Navy
- Preceded by: Frolic class
- Succeeded by: Condor class
- Built: 1873–1875
- Completed: 2
- Lost: 1
- Scrapped: 1

General characteristics (as built)
- Type: Composite screw gunvessel
- Displacement: 720 long tons (730 t)
- Length: 167 ft 0 in (50.9 m) (oa); 150 ft 2 in (45.8 m) (p/p)
- Beam: 28 ft 6 in (8.7 m)
- Draught: 13 ft 6 in (4.1 m)
- Depth of hold: 17 ft 6 in (5.3 m)
- Installed power: 656–829 ihp (489–618 kW); 3 × boilers
- Propulsion: 1 × 2-cylinder horizontal compound-expansion steam engine; 1 hoisting screw
- Sail plan: Barque rig
- Speed: 10 knots (19 km/h; 12 mph)
- Range: 790 nmi (1,460 km; 910 mi) at 10 knots (19 km/h; 12 mph)
- Complement: 90
- Armament: 1 × 7-inch rifled muzzle-loading gun; 2 × 6.3-inch 64-pounder rifled muzzle-loading guns; 2 × machine guns; 1 × light gun

The Arab-class gunvessels were a pair of composite gunboats built for the Royal Navy in the mid-1870s.

== Design and construction ==
Designed by Nathaniel Barnaby, the Royal Navy's Chief Constructor, both ships was ordered from the Govan yard of Robert Napier and Sons in 1873 and laid down the same year as yard numbers 333 and 334. They were launched within days of each other in October 1874.

The hull was built of iron frames and ribs, and planked in wood. This "composite" construction was both cheap and easy to repair and allowed the wooden planking to be coppered, reducing marine growth. On far-flung colonial stations, the benefits of both simple repair and reduced marine growth were particularly positive, due to a lack of substantial ship repair and careening facilities. For this reason, smaller vessels like the Arab class continued to use composite construction until long after larger vessels had transitioned to iron or steel construction.

=== Propulsion ===
Steam was provided at 60 pounds per square inch (410 kPa) by 3 boilers to a single 2-cylinder horizontal compound-expansion steam engine generating a designed 570 indicated horsepower (430 kW). In the event, Arab produced 656 ihp on trials, and Lily produced 829 ihp. A single screw was provided, which could be hoisted clear of the water to improve the ship's hull lines when sailing. A sailing rig was provided, with square rig on the fore and main masts, and fore-and-aft rigging only on the mizzen, giving her a "barque" rig.

=== Armament ===
A single 7-inch rifled muzzle-loading gun amidships and two 6.3-inch 64-pounder rifled muzzle-loading guns, one forward and one aft, and both fitted on traversing slides, constituted the main armament. Two machine guns and a light gun were also fitted. Arab (but not her sister ship) was re-armed in about 1879, with the after 6.3-inch 64-pounder gun replaced by three 20-pounder breech-loading guns under a newly constructed poop deck.

== Ships ==
Ship	Builder	Laid down	Launched	Completed	Fate
HMS Arab	Robert Napier and Sons, Govan, Glasgow	1873	13 October 1874	July 1875	Sold for breaking, 1889
HMS Lily	Robert Napier and Sons, Govan, Glasgow	1873	27 October 1874	August 1875	Ran aground and wrecked, 16 September 1889

== Bibliography ==
- Ballard, G. A. (1942). "British Gunvessels of 1875: The Smaller Single-Screw Type". Mariner's Mirror. 28 (October): 308–13. doi:10.1080/00253359.1942.10658817.
- Lyon, David & Winfield, Rif (2004). The Sail and Steam Navy List: All the Ships of the Royal Navy 1815–1889. Chatham Publishing. ISBN 978-1-86176-032-6. OCLC 52620555.
- Roberts, John (1979). "Great Britain (including Empire Forces)". In Chesneau, Roger & Kolesnik, Eugene M. (eds.). Conway's All the World's Fighting Ships 1860–1905. Mayflower Books. pp. 1–113. ISBN 0-8317-0302-4.
